= Metal salen complex =

Coordination complex

A metal salen complex is a coordination compound between a metal cation and a ligand derived from N,N′-bis(salicylidene)ethylenediamine, commonly called salen. The classical example is salcomine, the complex with divalent cobalt Co^{2+}, usually denoted as Co(salen). These complexes are widely investigated as catalysts and enzyme mimics.

A square planar metal–salen complex. The M denotes the metal atom; R and R′ denote precursor ingredients.

The metal-free salen compound (H_{2}salen or salenH_{2}) has two phenolic hydroxyl groups. The salen ligand is usually its conjugate base (salen^{2−}), resulting from the loss of protons from those hydroxyl groups. The metal atom usually makes four coordination bonds to the oxygen and nitrogen atoms.

== Preparation of complexes ==
The salen anion forms complexes with most transition metals. These complexes are usually prepared by the reaction of H_{2}salen ("proligand") with metal precursors containing built-in bases, such as alkoxides, metal amides, or metal acetate. The proligand may also be treated with a metal halide, with or without an added base. Lastly, the proligand may be deprotonated by a nonnucleophilic base, such as sodium hydride, before treatment with the metal halide. For example, Jacobsen's catalyst is prepared from the salen ligand precursor with manganese acetate.

=== Structures ===
Structure of [Cr(salen)(H_{2}O)_{2}]^{+}.

Salen complexes with d^{8} metal ions, such as Ni(salen), typically have a low-spin square planar molecular geometry in the coordination sphere.

Other metal–salen complexes may have additional ligands above the salen nitrogen–oxygen plane. Complexes with one extra ligand, such as VO(salen), may have a square pyramidal molecular geometry. Complexes with two extra ligands, such as Co(salen)Cl(py), may have octahedral geometry. Usually the MN_{2}O_{2} core is relatively planar, even though the ethylene backbone is skewed and the overall salen ligand takes a twisted C_{2} symmetry. Examples exist where ancillary ligands force the N_{2}O_{2} donors out of planarity. No evidence indicates that salen is a redox-noninnocent ligand.

== Reactions ==
Structure of Co(salen)(CH_{2}CHMe_{2})(4-picoline), a mimic of the organocobalt center in vitamin B_{12}.

The pyridine adduct of the cobalt(II) complex Co(salen)(py) (salcomine) has a square-pyramidal structure. It is a dioxygen carrier by forming a labile, octahedral O_{2} complex.

The name "salen ligands" is used for tetradentate ligands which have similar structures. For example, in salpn there is a methyl substituent on the bridge. It is used as a metal deactivation additive in fuels. The presence of bulky groups near the coordination site may enhance the catalytic activity of a metal complex and prevent its dimerization. Salen ligands derived from 3,5-di-tert-butylsalicylaldehyde fulfill these roles, and also increase the solubility of the complexes in non-polar solvents like pentane. Chiral "salen" ligands may be created by proper substitution of the diamine backbone, the phenyl ring, or both. An example is the ligand obtained by condensation of the C_{2}-symmetric trans-1,2-diaminocyclohexane with 3,5-di-tert-butylsalicylaldehyde. Chiral salen-type ligands may be used in asymmetric synthesis reactions.

== History ==
Tsumaki described the first metal–salen complexes in 1938. He found that the cobalt(II) complex Co(salen) reversibly binds O_{2}, which led to intensive research on cobalt complexes of salen and related ligands for their capacity for oxygen storage and transport, looking for potential synthetic oxygen carriers. Cobalt salen complexes also replicate certain aspects of vitamin B_{12}.

The manganese-containing salen complex catalyzes the asymmetric epoxidation of alkenes. In the hydrolytic kinetic resolution technique, a racemic mixture of epoxides may be separated by selectively hydrolyzing one enantiomer, catalyzed by the analogous cobalt(III) complex. In subsequent work, chromium(III) and cobalt(III) salen complexes catalyze the reaction of carbon dioxide and epoxides to give polycarbonates.

== Related complexes ==
=== Substituted salen complexes ===
Salpn, a substituted salen ligand

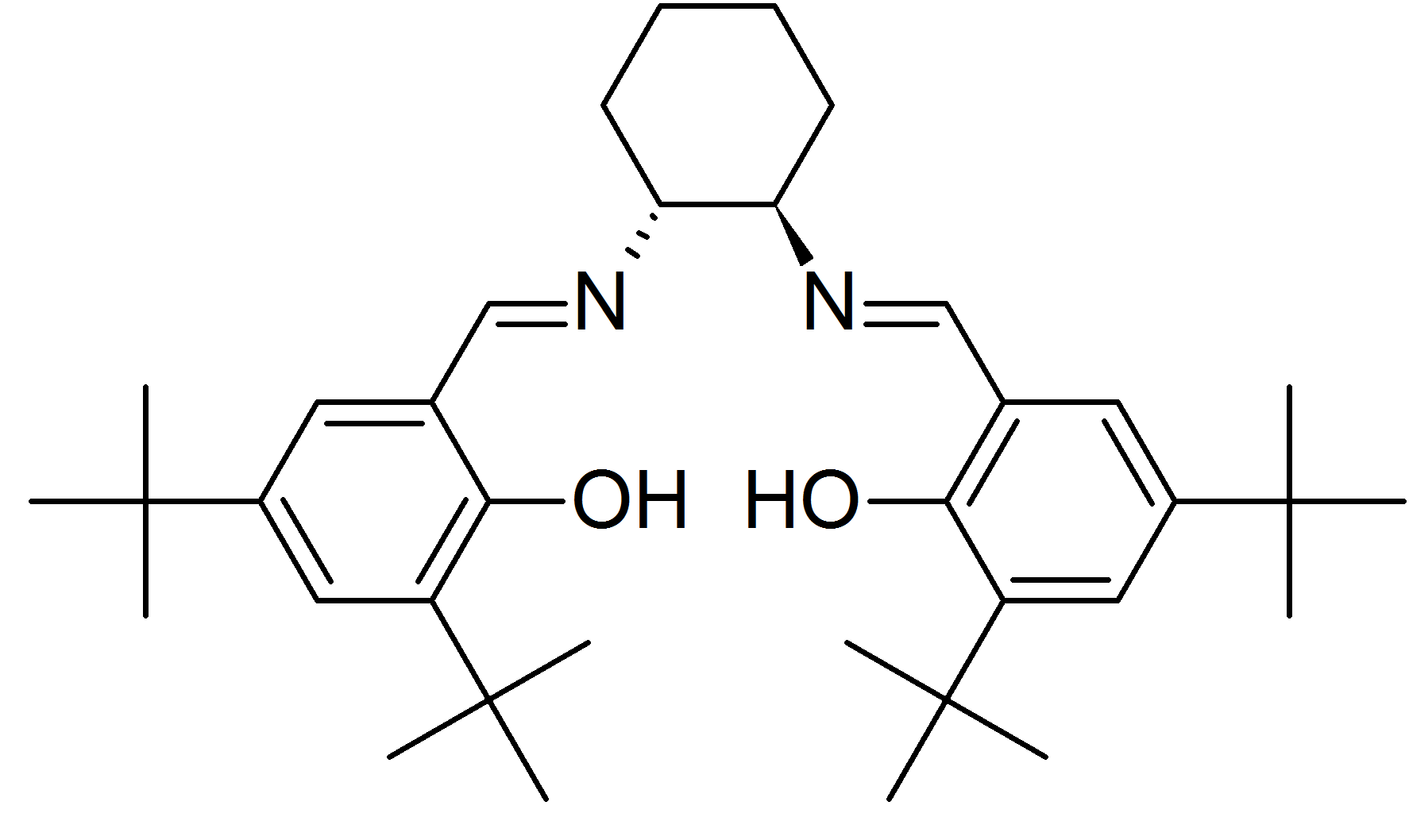
Salen ligand use for Jacobsen's catalyst

Complexes of salen per se are poorly soluble in organic solvents. Substitution of the organic framework increases the solubility of the complex. An example is the salpn ligand, derived from 1,2-diaminopropane instead of ethylenediamine, which is used as a metal deactivating additive in motor oils and motor fuel.

The presence of bulky groups adjacent to the phenoxide group can give complexes with enhanced catalytic activity. These substituents suppress formation of dimers. For these reasons, salen ligands derived from 3,5-di-tert-butylsalicylaldehyde have received particular scrutiny.

Chirality may be introduced into the ligand either via the diamine backbone, via the phenyl ring, or both. For example, condensation of the C_{2}-symmetric trans-1,2-diaminocyclohexane with 3,5-di-tert-butylsalicylaldehdye gives a ligand that forms complexes with Cr, Mn, Co, Al, which have proven useful for asymmetric transformations. For instance, the aforementioned Jacobsen's catalyst was successfully used for the enantioselective epoxidation of unfunctionalized alkyl- and aryl- substituted alkenes, namely Jacobsen epoxidation.

=== Complexes with salen-type ligands ===
The name “salen” or “salen-type” may be used for other ligands that have similar environment around the chelating site, namely two acidic hydroxyls and two Schiff base (aryl-imine) groups. These include the ligands abbreviated as salph, from the condensation of 1,2-phenylenediamine and salicylaldehyde. Other "Salen-type" metal complexes are formed with ligands with similar chelating groups, such as salph and salqu. Salqu copper complexes have been investigated as oxidation catalysts.

salan or salalen ligands have one or two saturated nitrogen–aryl bonds (amines rather than imines). They are less rigid and more electron-rich at the metal center than the corresponding salen complexes. Salans can be synthesized by the alkylation of an appropriate amine with a phenolic alkyl halide. The “half-salen” ligands have only one salicylimine group. They are prepared from a salicylaldehyde and a monoamine.

=== Acacen ligands ===
Synthesis and complexation of Jäger's ligand.

A class of tetradentate ligands with the generic name acacen are obtained by the condensation of two equivalents of acetylacetone with ethylenediamine. Some acacen complexes are oxygen carriers, reminiscent of the behavior of myoglobin.
