= Asymmetric catalytic oxidation =

Technique of oxidizing various substrates

Asymmetric catalytic oxidation is a technique of oxidizing various substrates to give an enantio-enriched product using a catalyst. Typically, but not necessarily, asymmetry is induced by the chirality of the catalyst. Typically, but again not necessarily, the methodology applies to organic substrates. Functional groups that can be prochiral and readily susceptible to oxidation include certain alkenes and thioethers. Challenging but pervasive prochiral substrates are C-H bonds of alkanes. Instead of introducing oxygen, some catalysts, biological and otherwise, enantioselectively introduce halogens, another form of oxidation.

== Reactions according to substrate ==
=== Hydrocarbons ===
Typically a prochiral C-H bond is converted to a chiral alcohol. Many examples of this important reaction result from the action of cytochrome P450, which allows these enzymes to process prodrugs and xenobiotics. Alpha-ketoglutarate-dependent hydroxylases also catalyze hydroxylations.

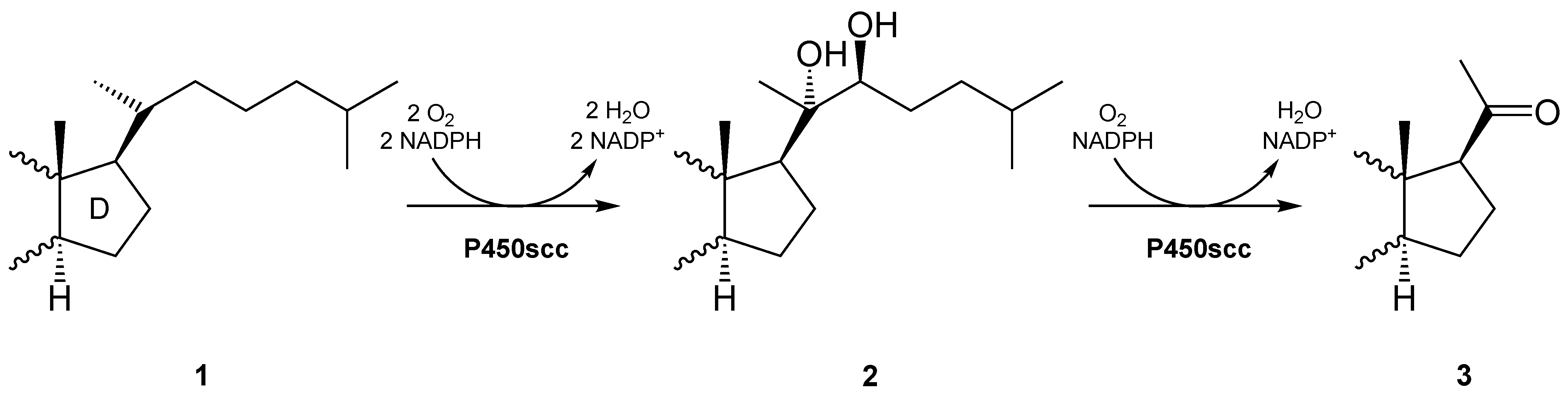
The conversion of cholesterol (only affected portion shown) to pregnenolone via the intermediate 20α,22β-dihydroxycholesterol (2). The reactions are catalyzed by cytochrome P450.

=== Alkenes ===
The oxidation of alkenes has attracted much attention. Asymmetric epoxidation is often feasible. One named reaction is the Jacobsen epoxidation, which uses manganese-salen complex as a chiral catalyst and NaOCl as the oxidant. The Sharpless epoxidation using chiral N-heterocyclic ligands and osmium tetroxide. Instead of asymmetric epoxidation, alkenes are susceptible to asymmetric dihydroxylation. The method is especially applicable to allyl alcohols using a catalyst derived from titanium isopropoxide and diethyl tartrate. tert-Butyl hydroperoxide is the oxidant. This conversion, the Sharpless asymmetric dihydroxylation, was recognized by a Nobel Prize. Metal-free asymmetric olefin oxidation have been developed. For example, the Shi epoxidation of alkenes using oxone can be made asymmetric using a fructose-derived catalyst.

=== Sulfur compounds ===
The enantioselective oxidation of unsymmetrical thioethers to sulfoxides is a well established. The common over the counter medication Esomeprazole (brandname: Nexium) involves such an asymmetric oxidation as its final step. Even disulfides are susceptible to oxidation to chiral thiosulfinites.
