= C15H22O2 =

The molecular formula C_{15}H_{22}O_{2} (molar mass : 234.33 g/mol) may refer to:

- Coprinol
- 3,5-Di-tert-butylsalicylaldehyde
- Polygodial, an active constituent of Dorrigo Pepper, Mountain Pepper, Horopito, Canelo, Paracress and Water-pepper
- Valerenic acid, a sesquiterpenoid constituent of the essential oil of the Valerian plant
