= Tsutomu Katsuki =

Japanese organic chemist

- Born: September 23, 1946
- Died: October 13, 2014 (aged 68)
- Education: Kyushu University
- Known for: enantioselective synthesis, Jacobsen epoxidation
- Scientific career
- Fields: Organic chemistry
- Workplaces: Kyushu University
- Doctoral advisor: Masaru Yamaguchi
- Other academic advisors: Karl Barry Sharpless

Tsutomu Katsuki (September 23, 1946 – October 13, 2014) was an organic chemist who primarily focused on asymmetric oxidation reactions utilizing transition metal catalysts.

== Education ==
Katsuki performed doctoral studies in the lab of Masaru Yamaguchi, contributing to the development of the Yamaguchi esterification. As a postdoctoral research associate with Professor Karl Barry Sharpless at Stanford University, he performed the first Sharpless epoxidation reaction. This reaction would eventually be acknowledged with the 2001 Nobel Prize in Chemistry (Sharpless).
