= Sweetening (disambiguation) =

Sweetening is the process of making food more sweet. Wikipedia does not yet have an article on this process.

Sweetening may also refer to:

- Copper sweetening, a petroleum refining process
- Food sweetening, adding the basic taste of sweetness to a food
- Gas sweetening, a group of processes that use aqueous solutions of various amines to remove hydrogen sulfide and carbon dioxide from gases, see Amine gas treating
- Pipe sweetening, a method by which foul tasting residues are removed from the bowl and shank of a briar tobacco pipe
- Sweetening (show business), the use of a laugh track in addition to a live studio audience in television
- Sweetening, an audio technician terminology used for artificial laughter inserted into the show
