= Biotin hydrazide =

Names
- Preferred IUPAC name 5-[(3aS,4S,6aR)-2-Oxohexahydro-1H-thieno[3,4-d]imidazol-4-yl]pentanehydrazide
- Other names (+)-Biotin hydrazide

Identifiers
CAS Number	66640-86-6
3D model (JSmol)	Interactive image
ChEMBL	ChEMBL4458159
ChemSpider	75684
ECHA InfoCard	100.110.982
EC Number	613-970-0
PubChem CID	83872
UNII	BD4VQ48JNV
CompTox Dashboard (EPA)	DTXSID50985217
- InChI: InChI=1S/C10H18N4O2S/c11-14-8(15)4-2-1-3-7-9-6(5-17-7)12-10(16)13-9/h6-7,9H,1-5,11H2,(H,14,15)(H2,12,13,16)/t6-,7-,9-/m0/s1 Key: KOZWHQPRAOJMBN-ZKWXMUAHSA-N
- SMILES: C1[C@H]2[C@@H]([C@@H](S1)CCCCC(=O)NN)NC(=O)N2

Properties
Chemical formula	C_{10}H_{18}N_{4}O_{2}S
Molar mass	258.34 g·mol^{−1}
- Except where otherwise noted, data are given for materials in their standard state (at 25 °C [77 °F], 100 kPa). Infobox references

Biotin hydrazide is a biotinyl derivative that can be used as a probe for the determination of protein carbonylation. It readily forms Schiff bases with carbonyl groups.
