= Jacobsen's catalyst =

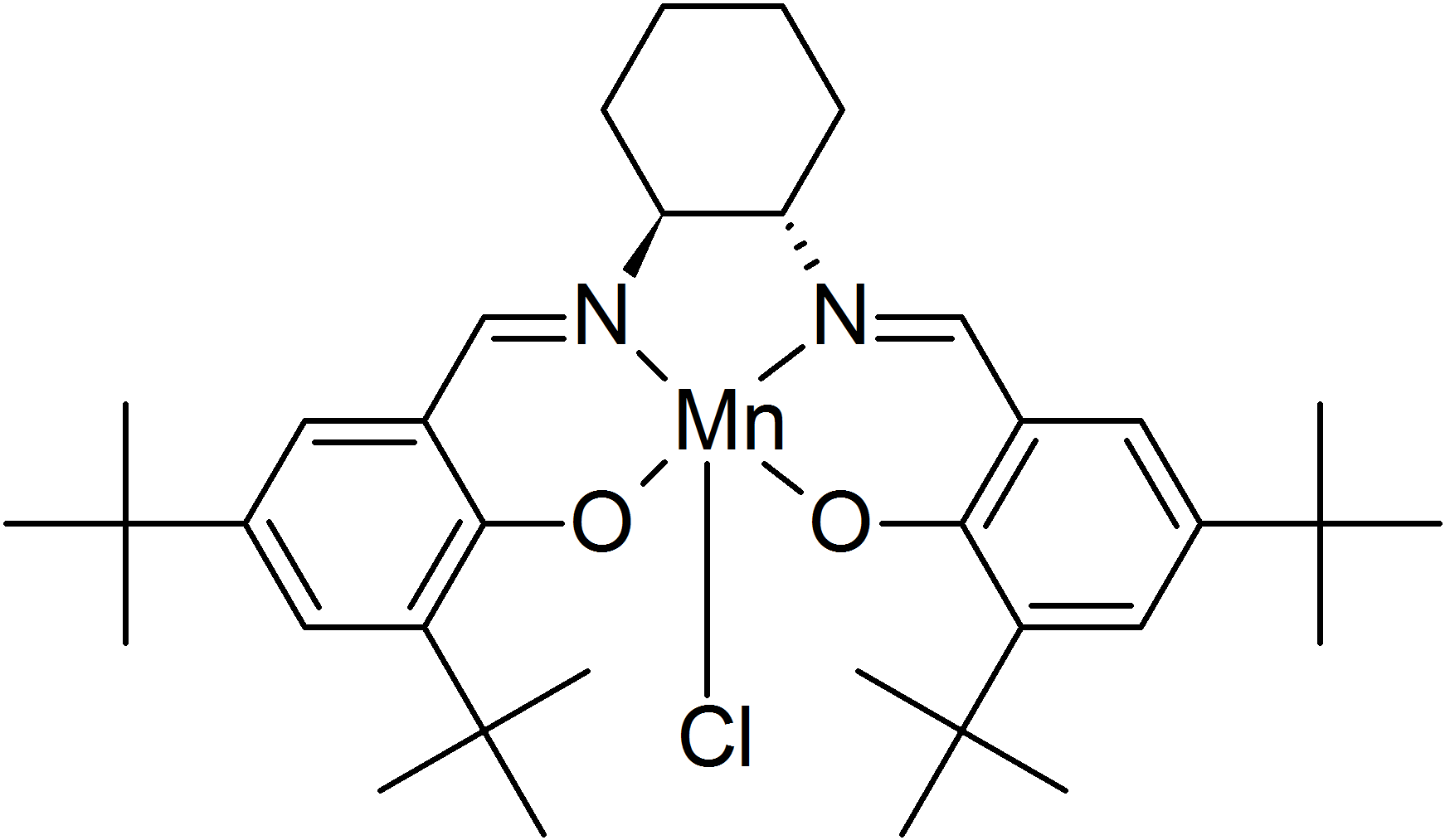

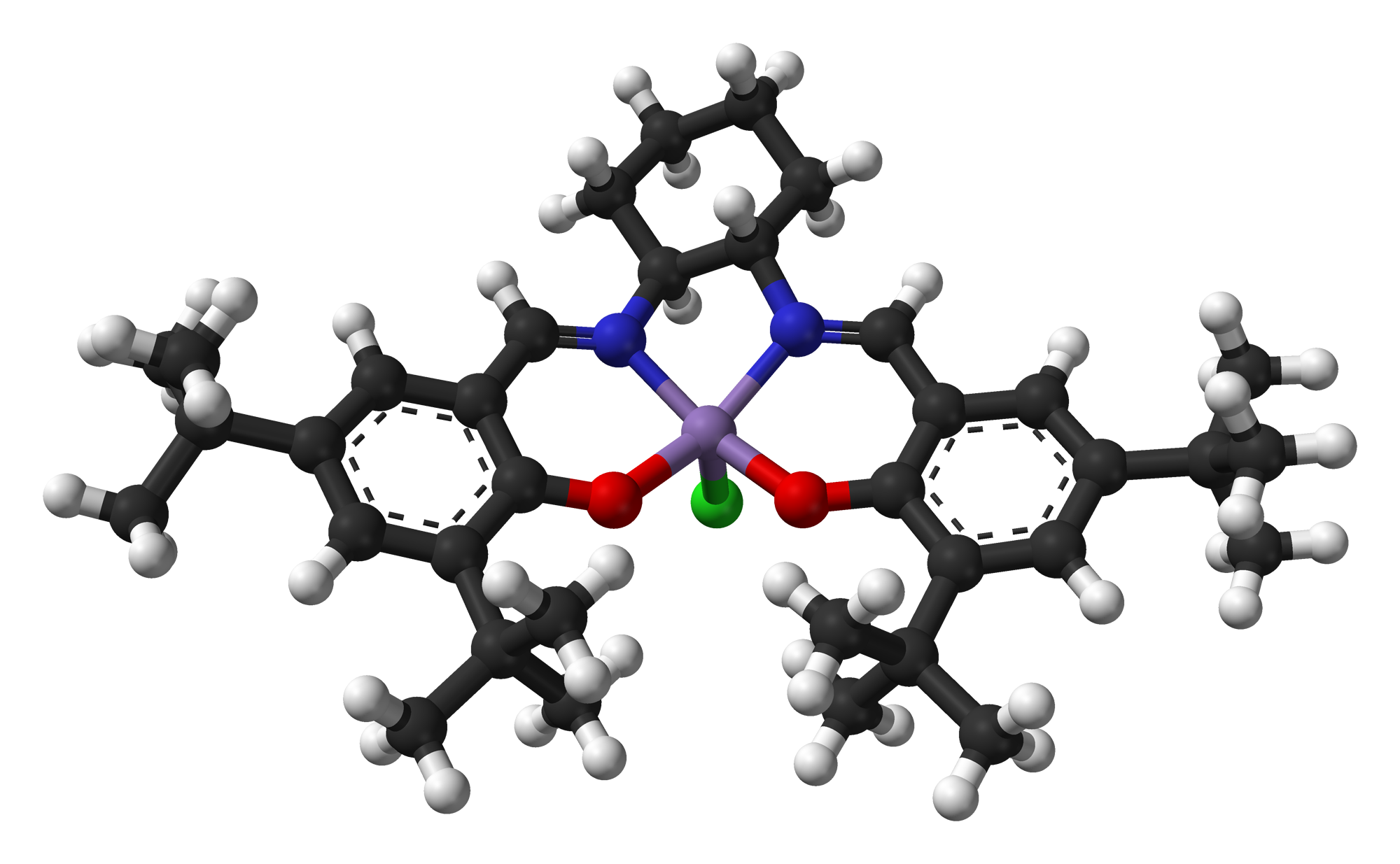

Names
- IUPAC name N,N'-bis(3,5-di-tert-butylsalicylidene)-1,2-cyclohexanediaminomanganese(III) chloride

Identifiers
CAS Number	138124-32-0
3D model (JSmol)	Interactive image
ChemSpider	21171274
ECHA InfoCard	100.108.565
EC Number	604-063-0
PubChem CID	73602790
UNII	WPP775Y8PO
- InChI: InChI=1S/C36H54N2O2.ClH.Mn/c1-33(2,3)25-17-23(31(39)27(19-25)35(7,8)9)21-37-29-15-13-14-16-30(29)38-22-24-18-26(34(4,5)6)20-28(32(24)40)36(10,11)12;;/h17-22,29-30,39-40H,13-16H2,1-12H3;1H;/q;;+3/p-3/t29-,30-;;/m1../s1 Key: LJVAWOSDJSQANR-SEILFYAJSA-K; InChI=1S/C36H54N2O2.ClH.Mn/c1-33(2,3)25-17-23(31(39)27(19-25)35(7,8)9)21-37-29-15-13-14-16-30(29)38-22-24-18-26(34(4,5)6)20-28(32(24)40)36(10,11)12;;/h17-22,29-30,39-40H,13-16H2,1-12H3;1H;/q;;+3/p-3/b37-21+,38-22+;;/t29-,30-;;/m0../s1
- SMILES: CC(C)(C)c1cc2/C=[N+]5/[C@H]4CCCC[C@@H]4/[N+]6=C/c3cc(cc(c3O[Mn-2]56(Cl)Oc2c(c1)C(C)(C)C)C(C)(C)C)C(C)(C)C

Properties
Chemical formula	C_{36}H_{52}ClMnN_{2}O_{2}
Molar mass	635.21 g·mol^{−1}
Appearance	brown solid
Melting point	330 to 332 °C (626 to 630 °F; 603 to 605 K)

Hazards
- GHS labelling
Pictograms	(GHS07: Exclamation mark)
Signal word	Warning
Hazard statements	H315, H319, H335
Precautionary statements	P261, P264, P271, P280, P302+P352, P304+P340, P305+P351+P338, P312, P321, P332+P313, P337+P313, P362, P403+P233, P405, P501
- Except where otherwise noted, data are given for materials in their standard state (at 25 °C [77 °F], 100 kPa). Infobox references

Jacobsen's catalyst is the common name for N,N'-bis(3,5-di-tert-butylsalicylidene)-1,2-cyclohexanediaminomanganese(III) chloride, a coordination compound of manganese and a salen-type ligand. It is used as an asymmetric catalyst in the Jacobsen epoxidation, which is renowned for its ability to enantioselectively transform prochiral alkenes into epoxides. Before its development, catalysts for the asymmetric epoxidation of alkenes required the substrate to have a directing functional group, such as an alcohol as seen in the Sharpless epoxidation. This compound has two enantiomers, which give the appropriate epoxide product from the alkene starting material.

Enantiomerically pure epoxides are desirable as building blocks for complex molecules with specific chirality. Biologically active compounds can exhibit radically different activity based on differences in chirality and therefore the ability to obtain desired stereocenters in a molecule is of great importance to the pharmaceutical industry. Jacobsen's catalyst and other asymmetric catalysts are particularly useful in this field; for example, Jacobsen's catalyst was used to synthesize phenylisoserine, a side chain to the famous anti-cancer drug Taxol, in a four-step synthesis as early as 1992.

== Structure and basic properties ==
Jacobsen's catalyst consists of a salen ligand, tetradentate, meaning it binds to the central manganese metal through four bonds, one to each oxygen and nitrogen atom of the salen backbone. Its chirality is conferred from the diamine-derived backbone. The aryl groups are decorated with tert-butyl substituents, which amplify the asymmetry around the Mn center.

== Preparation ==
Both enantiomers of Jacobsen's catalyst are commercially available. Jacobsen's catalyst can be prepared by separating 1,2-diaminocyclohexane into its component enantiomers and then reacting the appropriate tartrate with 3,5-di-tert-butyl-2-hydroxybenzaldehyde to form a Schiff base (see intermediate formed in the reaction scheme below). Reaction with manganese(II) acetate in the presence of air gives the manganese(III) complex, which may be isolated as the chloro derivative after the addition of lithium chloride. Shown below is the preparation of the (R,R)-enantiomer. The synthesis has been adapted for undergraduate level chemistry courses in order to stress the importance of enantiomerically pure compounds.

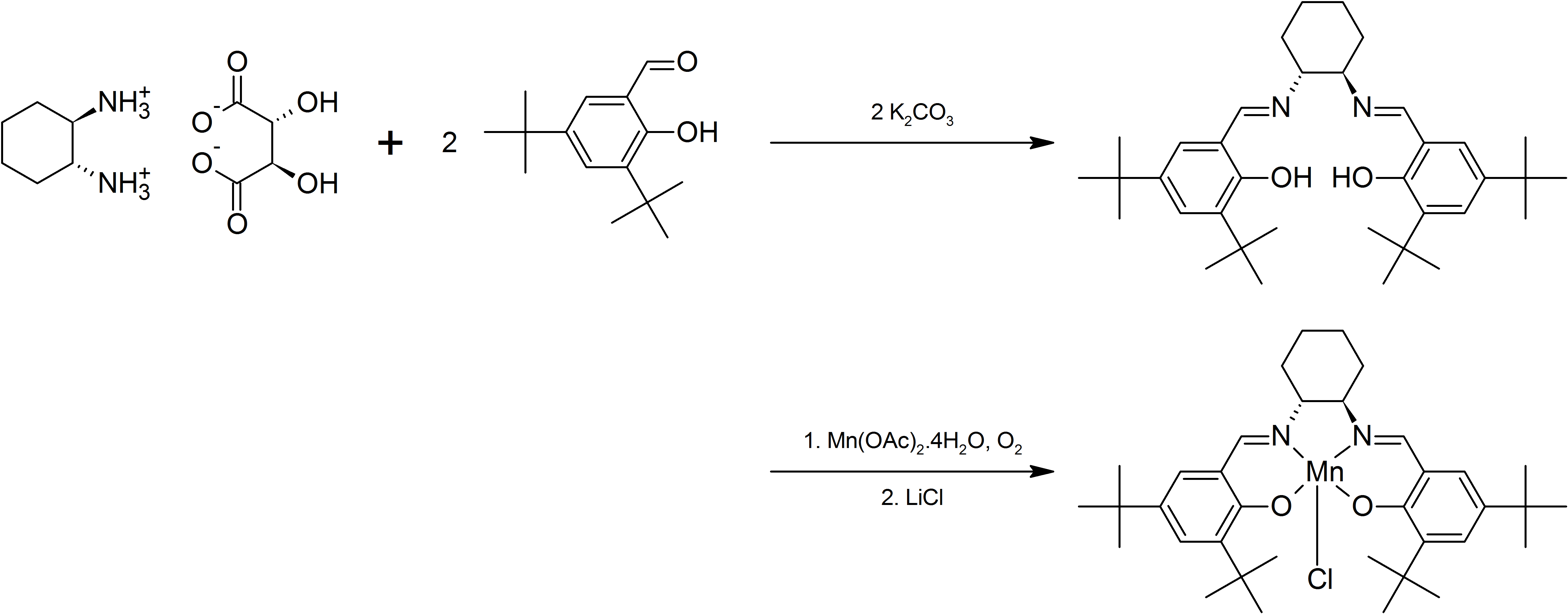

== Reaction mechanism ==
In general, two mechanisms have been suggested. Because Jacobsen's catalyst epoxidizes conjugated alkenes (i.e. those in which there are multiple double bonds on alternating carbons) most effectively, the generally accepted mechanism is based on a radical intermediate which is stabilized due to the conjugated nature of the substrate. For non-conjugated alkenes, the substrate is far less able to stabilize a radical, making a radical intermediate more unlikely. In this case, a concerted mechanism in which the bond to the oxygen is simultaneously broken with metal-center while it is formed with the substrate is probable. However, more recent studies have indicated a radical intermediate is possible, challenging the assumption that non-conjugated alkenes undergo concerted mechanisms.

In the original catalytic reaction, iodosylarenes (PhIO) were used as the stoichiometric oxidant, but soon after it was found that chlorine bleach (NaClO), a cheaper alternative, works as well. While other oxidants subsequently have been used, bleach continues to be the most common.

A simplified view of the catalytic cycle associated with Jacobsen's catalyst

After the addition of the oxidant to the system, O=Mn(V) is generally accepted to be the active oxidant species formed (step A). The substrate is thought to approach the metal-oxo bond from the side at a perpendicular orientation in relation to the catalyst in order to allow favorable orbital overlap. This mechanism, which was originally proposed by John Groves to explain porphyrin-catalyzed epoxidation reactions, is commonly referred to as a "side-on perpendicular approach". The approach is over the diamine bridge, where the steric bulk of the tert-butyl groups on the periphery of the ligand do not interfere with the alkene's approach (see below). However, as is the case with the overall mechanism, the pathway of alkene approach is also debated.

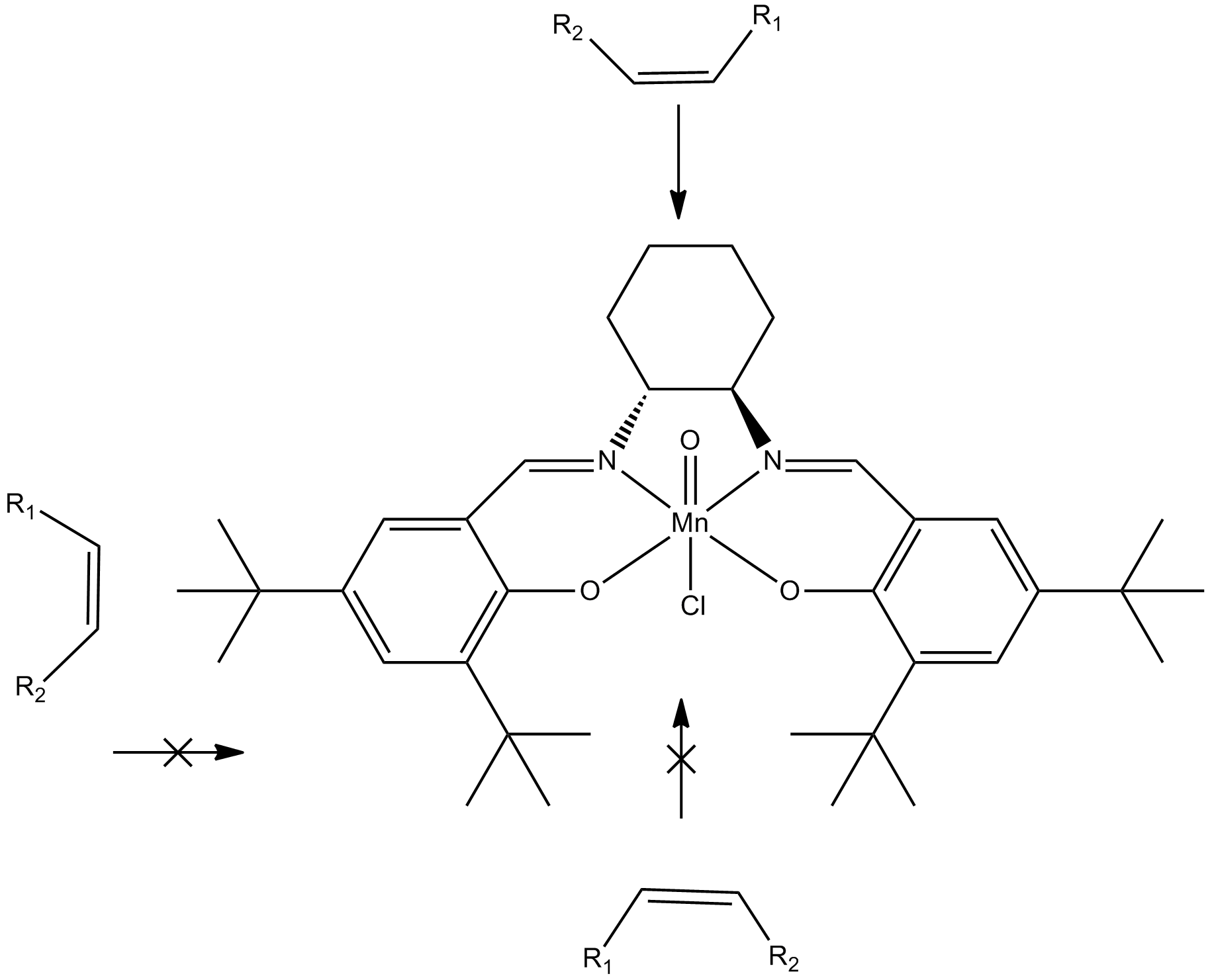
One proposed substrate approach pathway - Note: Substrates are perpendicular to the plane of the catalyst.

The ease with which Jacobsen's catalyst selectively epoxidizes cis-alkenes has been difficult to replicate with terminal and trans-alkenes. Structural changes to the ligand and adaptations to the protocol for the epoxidation reaction, however, have led to some successes in these areas. For example, derivatives of Jacobsen's catalyst with small structural changes to the salen backbone have been used in conjunction with low temperatures and the oxidant m-chloroperbenzoic acid (m-CPBA) to epoxidize the terminal alkene styrene. The low temperature of the reaction favors only one pathway, the cis pathway, while m-CPBA is used because of water's high freezing point. Little success has occurred with the epoxidation of trans alkenes by manganese compounds but other salen coordination compounds, such as oxochromium complexes, can be used.

== Variations ==
The ligand structure of Jacobsen's catalyst is easily modified for use over a wide range of reactions, such as epoxide-ring openings, Diels-Alder reactions, and conjugate additions. For example, an analogous catalyst with an aluminum center has been used for the carbonylation of epoxides in order to obtain beta-lactones.

== See also ==
- Asymmetric catalysis
- Enantiomers
- Jacobsen epoxidation
- Salen ligand
