= 3,5-Di-tert-butylsalicylaldehyde =

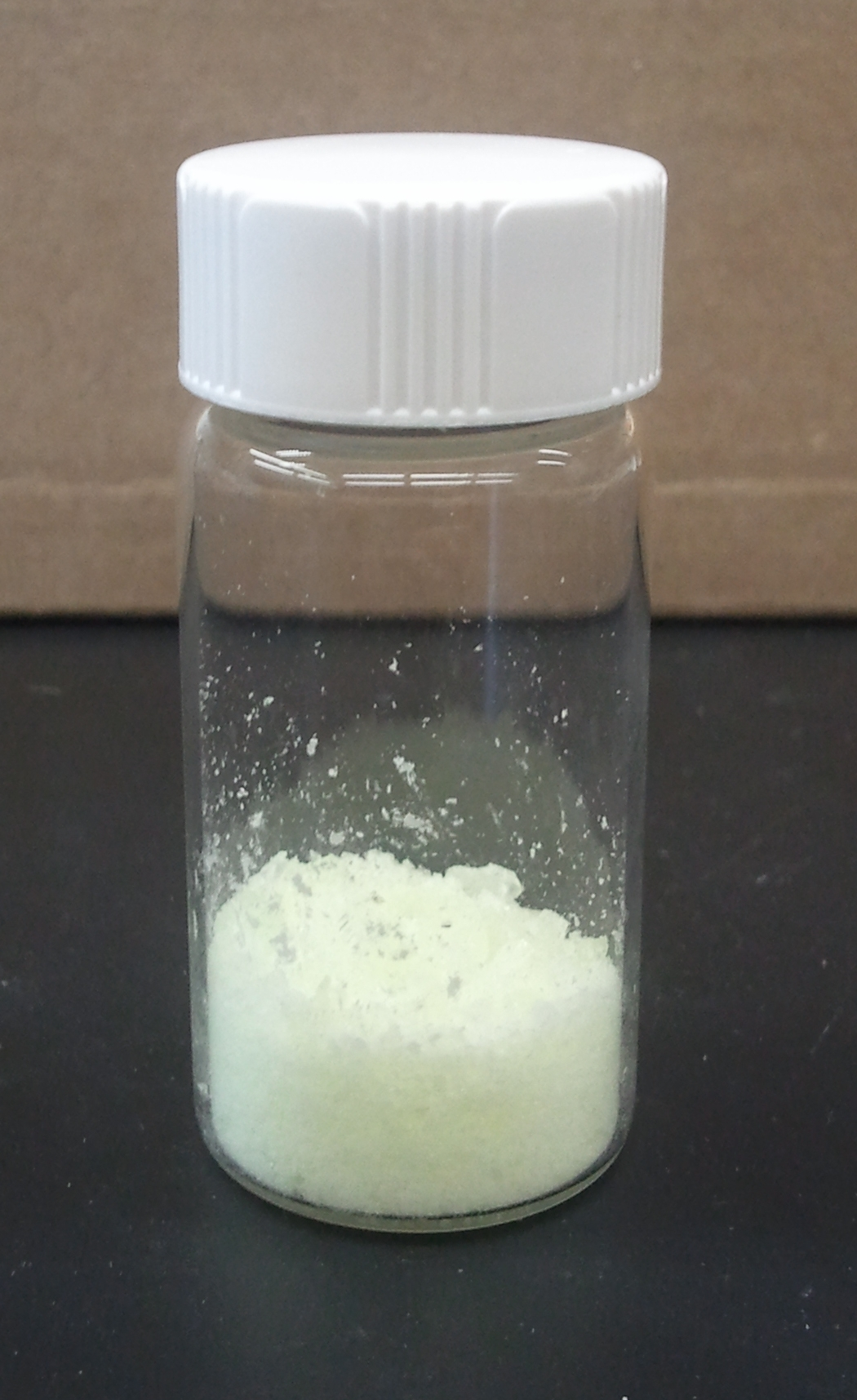

Names
- Preferred IUPAC name 3,5-Di-tert-butyl-2-hydroxybenzaldehyde

Identifiers
CAS Number	37942-07-7
3D model (JSmol)	Interactive image
ChEMBL	ChEMBL427197
ChemSpider	599518
ECHA InfoCard	100.157.837
PubChem CID	688023
UNII	KQA2N5HW8Z
CompTox Dashboard (EPA)	DTXSID80350777
- InChI: InChI=1S/C15H22O2/c1-14(2,3)11-7-10(9-16)13(17)12(8-11)15(4,5)6/h7-9,17H,1-6H3 Key: RRIQVLZDOZPJTH-UHFFFAOYSA-N; InChI=1S/C15H22O2/c1-14(2,3)11-7-10(9-16)13(17)12(8-11)15(4,5)6/h7-9,17H,1-6H3
- SMILES: O=Cc1cc(cc(c1O)C(C)(C)C)C(C)(C)C

Properties
Chemical formula	C_{15}H_{22}O_{2}
Molar mass	234.339 g·mol^{−1}
- Except where otherwise noted, data are given for materials in their standard state (at 25 °C [77 °F], 100 kPa). verify (what is ?) Infobox references

3,5'-Di-tert-butylsalicylaldehyde is an organic compound. It is a pale yellow solid. This aldehyde is a building block for preparing salen ligands.

== Preparation ==
This compound is commercially available. It may be prepared by the Duff reaction, from 2,4-di-tert-butylphenol and hexamethylenetetramine:

== Reactions ==
Condensation of this aldehyde with various diamines gives various salen ligands, which are popular for catalysis. For example, the enantiopure ligand for Jacobsen's catalyst may be prepared from the appropriate 1,2-diaminocyclohexane. The catalyst is obtained by further reaction with manganese(II) acetate and atmospheric oxygen in the presence of a chloride source.

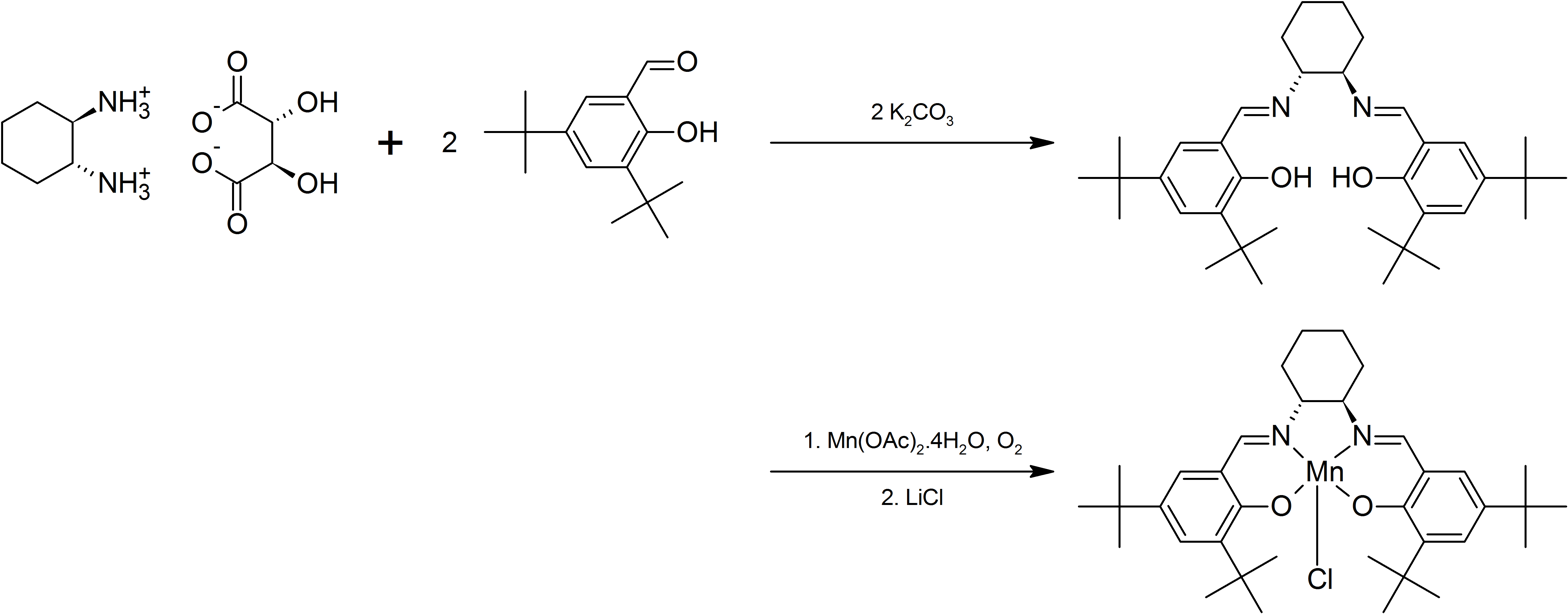
