= Bisthiosemicarbazone =

In organic chemistry, a bisthiosemicarbazone is a derivative from an elimination reaction between a thiosemicarbazide and a diketone. Their structure is H_{2}NHC(=S)NN=C(R_{1})−R_{2}−C(R_{3})=NNHC(=S)NH_{2}. A 'thiosemicarbazone' contains a sulfur atom in lieu of the ketonic oxygen in semicarbazone. Bisthiosemicarbazones are known to have antiviral, antimalarial and anticancer activity, usually mediated through binding to copper or iron in cells. They have also been identified as potential ligands for radioisotope delivery, with selectivity towards hypoxic tissues, particularly in the heart and brain. When chelated to zinc atoms some bisthiosemicarbazones may have uses as fluorescing agents in optical microscopy.

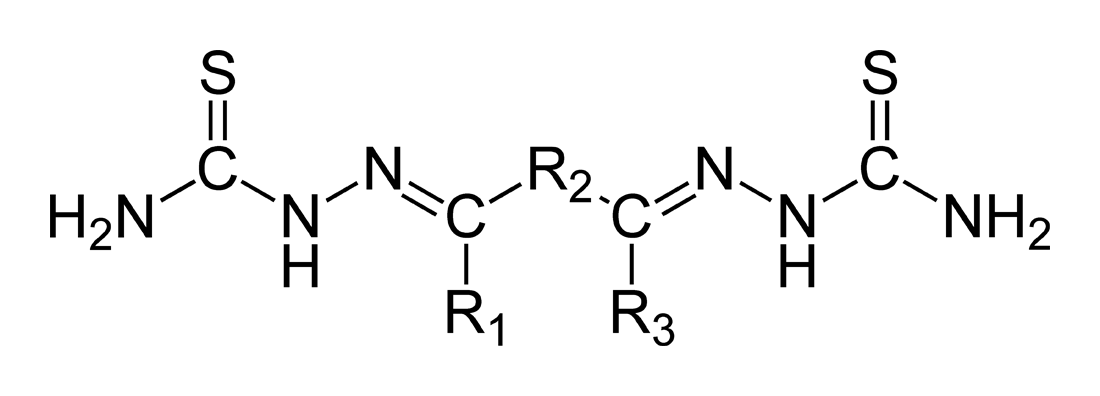
General structural formula of bisthiosemicarbazones

== See also ==
- Salen ligand
- Ambazone
