= Transition metal dioxygen complex =

Dioxygen complexes are coordination compounds that contain O_{2} as a ligand. The study of these compounds is inspired by oxygen-carrying proteins such as myoglobin, hemoglobin, hemerythrin, and hemocyanin. Several transition metals form complexes with O_{2}, and many of these complexes form reversibly. The binding of O_{2} is the first step in many important phenomena, such as cellular respiration, corrosion, and industrial chemistry. The first synthetic oxygen complex was demonstrated in 1938 with cobalt(II) complex reversibly bound O_{2}.

== Mononuclear complexes of O_{2} ==
O_{2} binds to a single metal center either "end-on" (η^{1}-) or "side-on" (η^{2}-). The bonding and structures of these compounds are usually evaluated by single-crystal X-ray crystallography, focusing both on the overall geometry as well as the O–O distances, which reveals the bond order of the O_{2} ligand.

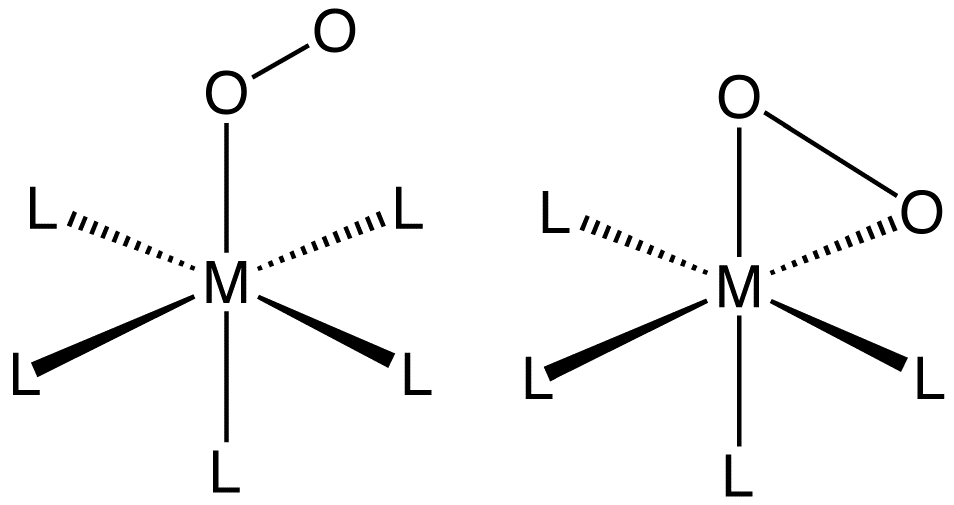

=== Complexes of η^{1}-O_{2} ligands ===
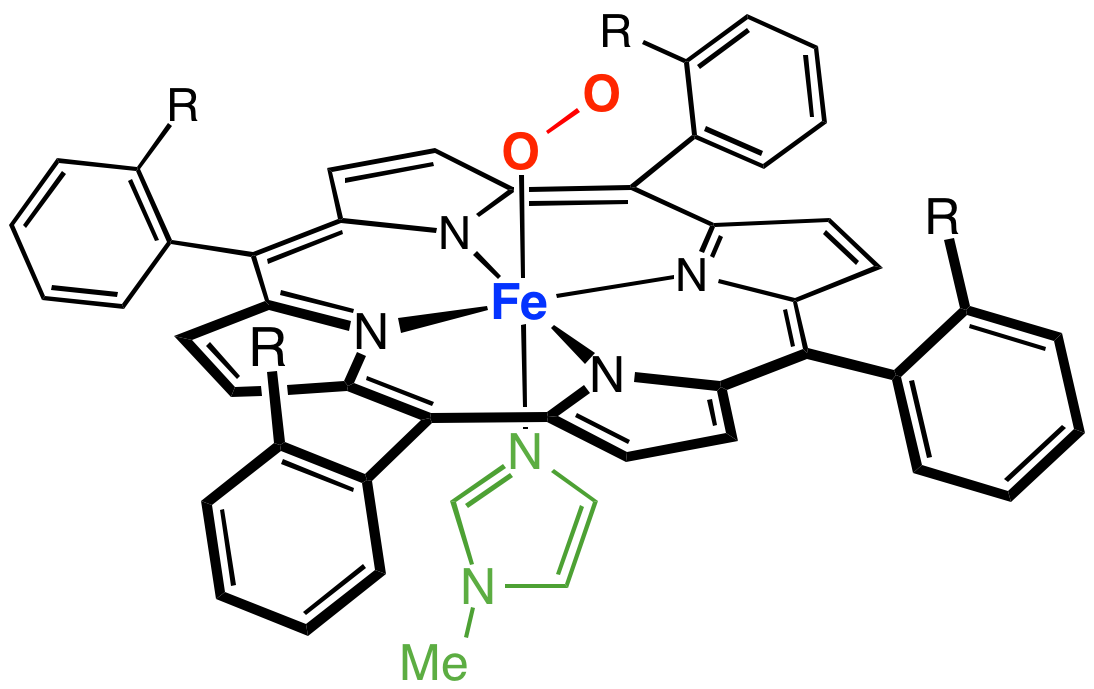
A picket-fence porphyrin complex of Fe, with axial coordination sites occupied by methylimidazole (green) and dioxygen (R = amide groups).

O_{2} adducts derived from cobalt(II) and iron(II) complexes of porphyrin (and related anionic macrocyclic ligands) exhibit this bonding mode. Myoglobin and hemoglobin are famous examples, and many synthetic analogues have been described that behave similarly. Binding of O_{2} is usually described as proceeding by electron transfer from the metal(II) center to give superoxide (O^{−}_{2}) complexes of metal(III) centers. As shown by the mechanisms of cytochrome P450 and alpha-ketoglutarate-dependent hydroxylase, Fe-η^{1}-O_{2} bonding is conducive to formation of Fe(IV) oxo centers. O_{2} can bind to one metal of a bimetallic unit via the same modes discussed above for mononuclear complexes. A well-known example is the active site of the protein hemerythrin, which features a diiron carboxylate that binds O_{2} at one Fe center. Dinuclear complexes can also cooperate in the binding, although the initial attack of O_{2} probably occurs at a single metal.

=== Complexes of η^{2}-O_{2} ligands ===
η^{2}-bonding is the most common motif seen in coordination chemistry of dioxygen. Such complexes can be generated by treating low-valent metal complexes with oxygen. For example, Vaska's complex reversibly binds O_{2} (Ph = C_{6}H_{5}):

IrCl(CO)(PPh_{3})_{2} + O_{2} ⇌ IrCl(CO)(PPh_{3})_{2}O_{2}

The conversion is described as a 2 e^{−} redox process: Ir(I) converts to Ir(III) as dioxygen converts to peroxide. Since O_{2} has a triplet ground state and Vaska's complex is a singlet, the reaction is slower than when singlet oxygen is used. The magnetic properties of some η^{2}-O_{2} complexes show that the ligand, in fact, is superoxide, not peroxide.

Most complexes of η^{2}-O_{2} are generated using hydrogen peroxide, not from O_{2}. Chromate ([CrO_{4})]^{2−}) can for example be converted to the tetraperoxide [Cr(O_{2})_{4}]^{2−}. The reaction of hydrogen peroxide with aqueous titanium(IV) gives a brightly colored peroxy complex that is a useful test for titanium as well as hydrogen peroxide.

== Binuclear complexes of O_{2} ==
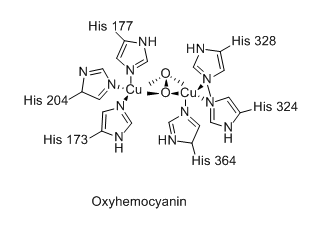
O_{2}-bound form of hemocyanin, the O_{2} carrier for certain molluscs.

These binding modes include μ_{2}-η^{2},η^{2}-, μ_{2}-η^{1},η^{1}-, and μ_{2}-η^{1},η^{2}-. Depending on the degree of electron-transfer from the dimetal unit, these O_{2} ligands can again be described as peroxo or superoxo. Hemocyanin is an O_{2} carrier that utilizes a bridging O_{2} binding motif. It features a pair of copper centers.

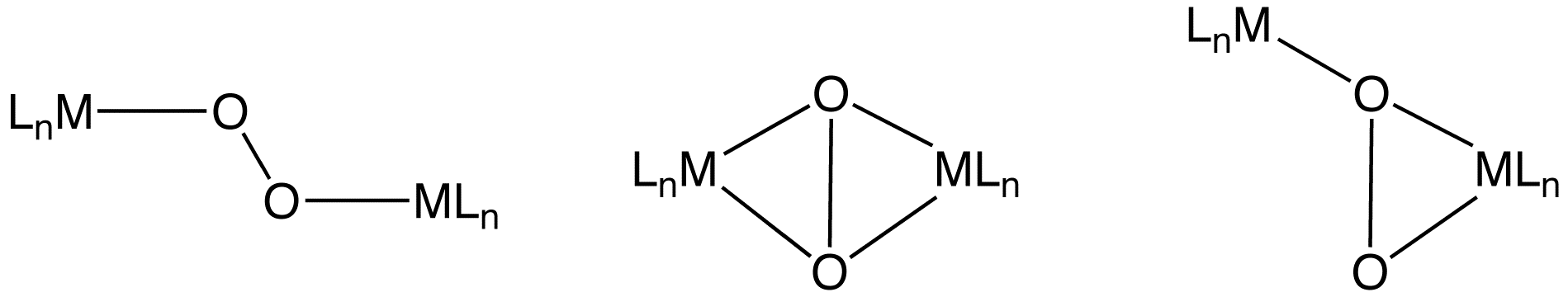

Structure of [Co(salen)(dmf)]_{2}O_{2}.

.

Salcomine, the cobalt(II) complex of salen ligand is the first synthetic O_{2} carrier. Solvated derivatives of the solid complex bind 0.5 equivalents of O_{2}:

2 Co(salen) + O_{2} → [Co(salen)]_{2}O_{2}

Reversible electron transfer reactions are observed in some dinuclear O_{2} complexes.

Oxidation of the dicobalt peroxy complex gives the complex of superoxide (O^{−}_{2}). The Co–O–O–Co core flattens in the process and the O–O distance contracts by 10%.

== Relationship to other oxygenic ligands and applications ==
Dioxygen complexes are the precursors to other families of oxygenic ligands. Metal oxo compounds arise from the cleavage of the O–O bond after complexation. Hydroperoxo complexes are generated in the course of the reduction of dioxygen by metals. The reduction of O_{2} by metal catalysts is a key half-reaction in fuel cells.

Metal-catalyzed oxidations with O_{2} proceed via the intermediacy of dioxygen complexes, although the actual oxidants are often oxo derivatives. The reversible binding of O_{2} to metal complexes has been used as a means to purify oxygen from air, but cryogenic distillation of liquid air remains the dominant technology.
