= Hemerythrin =

InterPro Family

Hemerythrin-like family
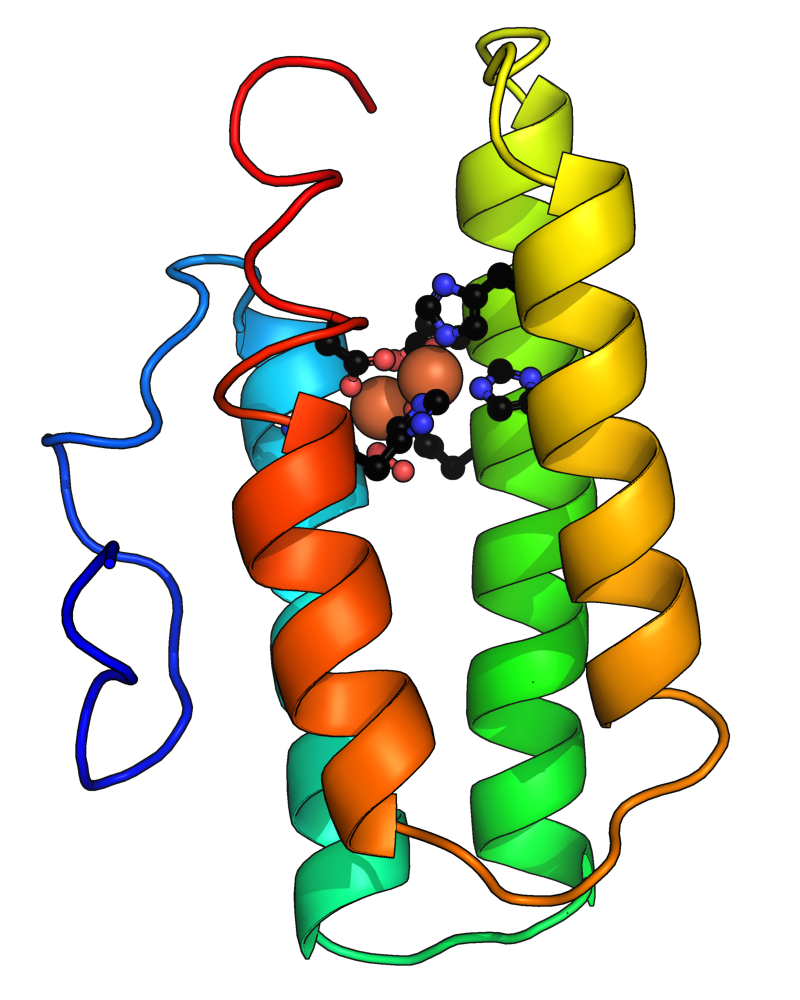
- Singly oxygenated hemerythrin protein. PDB: 1HMO

Identifiers
- Symbol: Hemerythrin
- Pfam: PF01814
- InterPro: IPR035938
- PROSITE: PDOC00476
- CATH: 1HMO
- SCOP2: 2HMZ / SCOPe / SUPFAM
Available protein structures:
- PDB: IPR035938 PF01814 (ECOD; PDBsum)
- AlphaFold: IPR035938; PF01814

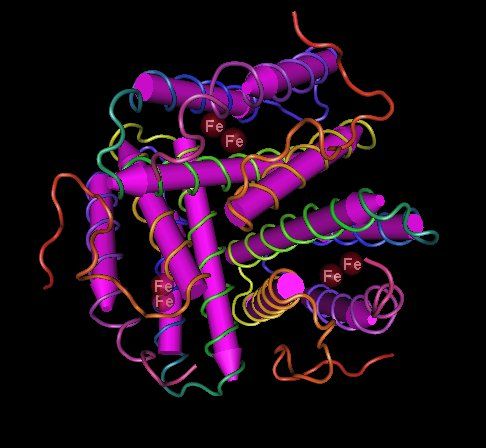
Trimeric Hemerythrin Protein Complex (PDB: 1HMO)

Hemerythrin (also spelled haemerythrin; Ancient Greek: αἷμα, romanized: haîma, lit. 'blood', Ancient Greek: ἐρυθρός, romanized: erythrós, lit. 'red') is an oligomeric protein responsible for oxygen (O_{2}) transport in the marine invertebrate phyla of priapulids, brachiopods, and in the annelid worm clades Magelona and Sipuncula. Myohemerythrin is a monomeric O_{2}-binding protein found in the muscles of marine invertebrates. Hemerythrin and myohemerythrin are essentially colorless when deoxygenated, but turn a violet-pink in the oxygenated state.

Hemerythrin does not, as the name might suggest, contain a heme. The names of the blood oxygen transporters hemoglobin, hemocyanin, and hemerythrin do not refer to the heme group (only found in globins). Instead, these names are derived from the Greek word for blood. Hemerythrin may also contribute to innate immunity and anterior tissue regeneration in certain worms.

== O_{2} binding mechanism ==
The mechanism of dioxygen binding is unusual. Most O_{2} carriers operate via formation of dioxygen complexes, but hemerythrin holds the O_{2} as a hydroperoxide (HO_{2}, or -OOH^{−}). The site that binds O_{2} consists of a pair of iron centres. The iron atoms are bound to the protein through the carboxylate side chains of a glutamate and aspartates as well as through five histidine residues. Hemerythrin and myohemerythrin are often described according to oxidation and ligation states of the iron center:

| Fe^{2+}—OH—Fe^{2+} | deoxy (reduced) |
| Fe^{2+}—OH—Fe^{3+} | semi-met |
| Fe^{3+}—O—Fe^{3+}—OOH^{−} | oxy (oxidized) |
| Fe^{3+}—OH—Fe^{3+}— (any other ligand) | met (oxidized) |

The uptake of O_{2} by hemerythrin is accompanied by two-electron oxidation of the diferrous centre to produce a hydroperoxide (OOH^{−}) complex. The binding of O_{2} is roughly described in this diagram:

Active site of hemerythrin before and after oxygenation.

Deoxyhemerythrin contains two high-spin ferrous ions bridged by hydroxyl group (A). One iron is hexacoordinate and another is pentacoordinate. A hydroxyl group serves as a bridging ligand but also functions as a proton donor to the O_{2} substrate. This proton-transfer result in the formation of a single oxygen atom (μ-oxo) bridge in oxy- and methemerythrin. O_{2} binds to the pentacoordinate Fe^{2+} centre at the vacant coordination site (B). Then electrons are transferred from the ferrous ions to generate the binuclear ferric (Fe^{3+},Fe^{3+}) centre with bound peroxide (C).

== Quaternary structure and cooperativity ==
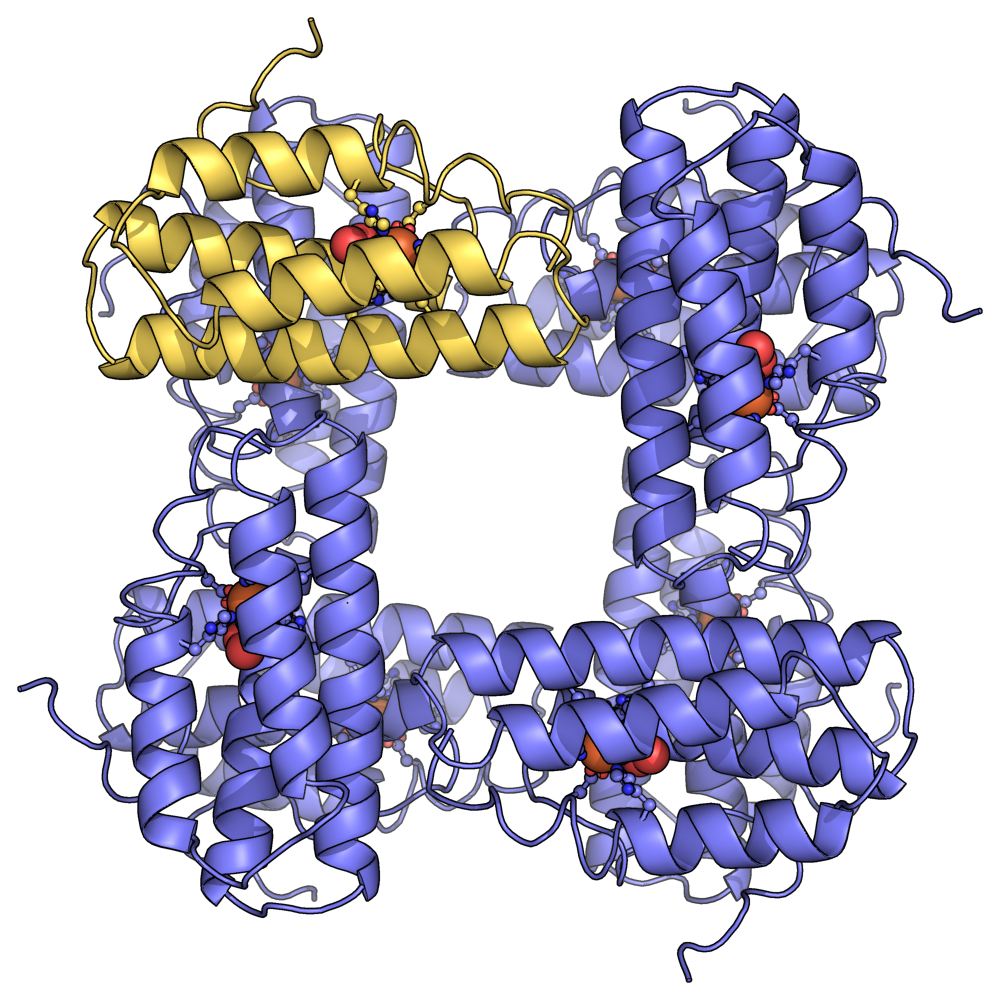
Hemerythrin homooctamer with a single monomer highlighted in yellow. PDB: 1HMO

Hemerythrin typically exists as a homooctamer or heterooctamer composed of α- and β-type subunits of 13–14 kDa each, although some species have dimeric, trimeric and tetrameric hemerythrins. Each subunit has a four-α-helix fold binding a binuclear iron centre. Because of its size hemerythrin is usually found in cells or "corpuscles" in the blood rather than free floating.

Unlike hemoglobin, most hemerythrins lack cooperative binding to oxygen, making it roughly 1/4 as efficient as hemoglobin. In some brachiopods though, hemerythrin shows cooperative binding of O_{2}. Cooperative binding is achieved by interactions between subunits: the oxygenation of one subunit increases the affinity of a second unit for oxygen.

Hemerythrin affinity for carbon monoxide (CO) is actually lower than its affinity for O_{2}, unlike hemoglobin which has a very high affinity for CO. Hemerythrin's low affinity for CO poisoning reflects the role of hydrogen-bonding in the binding of O_{2}, a pathway mode that is incompatible with CO complexes which usually do not engage in hydrogen bonding.

== Hemerythrin/HHE cation-binding domain ==
The hemerythrin/HHE cation-binding domain occurs as a duplicated domain in hemerythrins, myohemerythrins and related proteins. This domain binds iron in hemerythrin, but can bind other metals in related proteins, such as cadmium in the Nereis diversicolor hemerythrin. It is also found in the NorA protein from Cupriavidus necator, this protein is a regulator of response to nitric oxide, which suggests a different set-up for its metal ligands. A protein from Cryptococcus neoformans (Filobasidiella neoformans) that contains haemerythrin/HHE cation-binding domains is also involved in nitric oxide response. A Staphylococcus aureus protein containing this domain, iron-sulfur cluster repair protein ScdA, has been noted to be important when the organism switches to living in environments with low oxygen concentrations; perhaps this protein acts as an oxygen store or scavenger.

Hemerythrin/HHE (H-HxxxE-HxxxH-HxxxxD) proteins found in bacteria are implicated in signal transduction and chemotaxis. More distantly related ones include H-HxxxE-H-HxxxE proteins (including the E3 ligase) and animal F-box proteins (H-HExxE-H-HxxxE).
