= Diaminocyclohexanetetraacetic acid =

Names
- Other names CyDTAH4, DCTA

Identifiers
| CAS Number | 13291-61-7; monohydrate: 125572-95-4 |
| 3D model (JSmol) | Interactive image; monohydrate: Interactive image |
| ChemSpider | 2006033; monohydrate: 2006032 |
| EC Number | 236-308-9 |
| PubChem CID | 2723845; monohydrate: 2723844 |
| UNII | JD2BU42P20 |
- InChI: InChI=1S/C14H22N2O8/c17-11(18)5-15(6-12(19)20)9-3-1-2-4-10(9)16(7-13(21)22)8-14(23)24/h9-10H,1-8H2,(H,17,18)(H,19,20)(H,21,22)(H,23,24)/t9-,10-/m1/s1 Key: FCKYPQBAHLOOJQ-NXEZZACHSA-N; monohydrate: InChI=1S/C14H22N2O8.H2O/c17-11(18)5-15(6-12(19)20)9-3-1-2-4-10(9)16(7-13(21)22)8-14(23)24;/h9-10H,1-8H2,(H,17,18)(H,19,20)(H,21,22)(H,23,24);1H2/t9-,10-;/m1./s1 Key: VASZYFIKPKYGNC-DHTOPLTISA-N
- SMILES: C1CC[C@H]([C@@H](C1)N(CC(=O)O)CC(=O)O)N(CC(=O)O)CC(=O)O; monohydrate: C1CC[C@H]([C@@H](C1)N(CC(=O)O)CC(=O)O)N(CC(=O)O)CC(=O)O.O

Properties
| Chemical formula | C_{14}H_{22}N_{2}O_{8} |
| Molar mass | 346.336 g·mol^{−1} |
| Appearance | white solid |
| Melting point | 213–216 °C (415–421 °F; 486–489 K) |
- Except where otherwise noted, data are given for materials in their standard state (at 25 °C [77 °F], 100 kPa). Infobox references

Diaminocyclohexanetetraacetic acid is an organic compound with the formula C_{6}H_{10}(N(CH_{2}CO_{2}H)_{2})_{2}. It is an aminopolycarboxylic acid, structurally related to EDTA but with a chiral backbone derived from trans-1,2-diaminocyclohexane.

Among its many complexes are the 7-coordinate titanyl(IV), titanium(III), vanadium(III), and iron(III) derivatives. The Cr(III) derivative is 6-coordinate.
