= Trans-1,2-Diaminocyclohexane =

trans-1,2-Diaminocyclohexane

Names
- IUPAC name (±)-trans-1,2-Cyclohexanediamine
- Other names 1,2-Diaminocyclohexane; chxn

Identifiers
CAS Number	1121-22-8
3D model (JSmol)	Interactive image
ChemSpider	420572
ECHA InfoCard	100.112.387
PubChem CID	479307
UNII	37EKL250EE
CompTox Dashboard (EPA)	DTXSID60883654
- InChI: InChI=1S/C6H14N2/c7-5-3-1-2-4-6(5)8/h5-6H,1-4,7-8H2/t5-,6-/m0/s1 Key: SSJXIUAHEKJCMH-WDSKDSINSA-N; InChI=1/C6H14N2/c7-5-3-1-2-4-6(5)8/h5-6H,1-4,7-8H2/t5-,6-/m0/s1 Key: SSJXIUAHEKJCMH-WDSKDSINBK
- SMILES: N[C@H]1CCCC[C@@H]1N

Properties
Chemical formula	C_{6}H_{14}N_{2}
Molar mass	114.192 g·mol^{−1}
Appearance	Colorless liquid
Density	0.951 g/cm^{3}
Melting point	14 to 15 °C (57 to 59 °F; 287 to 288 K)
Boiling point	79 to 81 °C (174 to 178 °F; 352 to 354 K) 15 mmHg

Hazards
Flash point	69 °C; 156 °F; 342 K
- Except where otherwise noted, data are given for materials in their standard state (at 25 °C [77 °F], 100 kPa). verify (what is ?) Infobox references

trans-1,2-Diaminocyclohexane is an organic compound with the formula C_{6}H_{10}(NH_{2})_{2}. This diamine is a building block for C_{2}-symmetric ligands that are useful in asymmetric catalysis.

A mixture of all three stereoisomers of 1,2-diaminocyclohexane is produced by the hydrogenation of o-phenylenediamine. It is also side product in hydrogenation of adiponitrile. The racemic trans isomer (1:1 mixture of (1R,2R)-1,2-diaminocyclohexane and (1S,2S)-1,2-diaminocyclohexane) can be separated into the two enantiomers using enantiomerically pure tartaric acid as the resolving agent.

Oxaliplatin, a complex of (1R,2R)-diaminocyclohexane, is an important anticancer drug.

== Derived ligands ==
Representative ligands prepared from (1R,2R)- or (1S,2S)-1,2-diaminocyclohexane are diaminocyclohexanetetraacetic acid (CyDTAH_{4}), Trost ligand, and the salen analogue used in the Jacobsen epoxidation.
