= Salcomine =

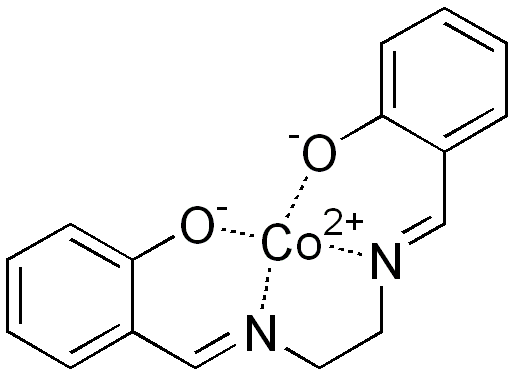

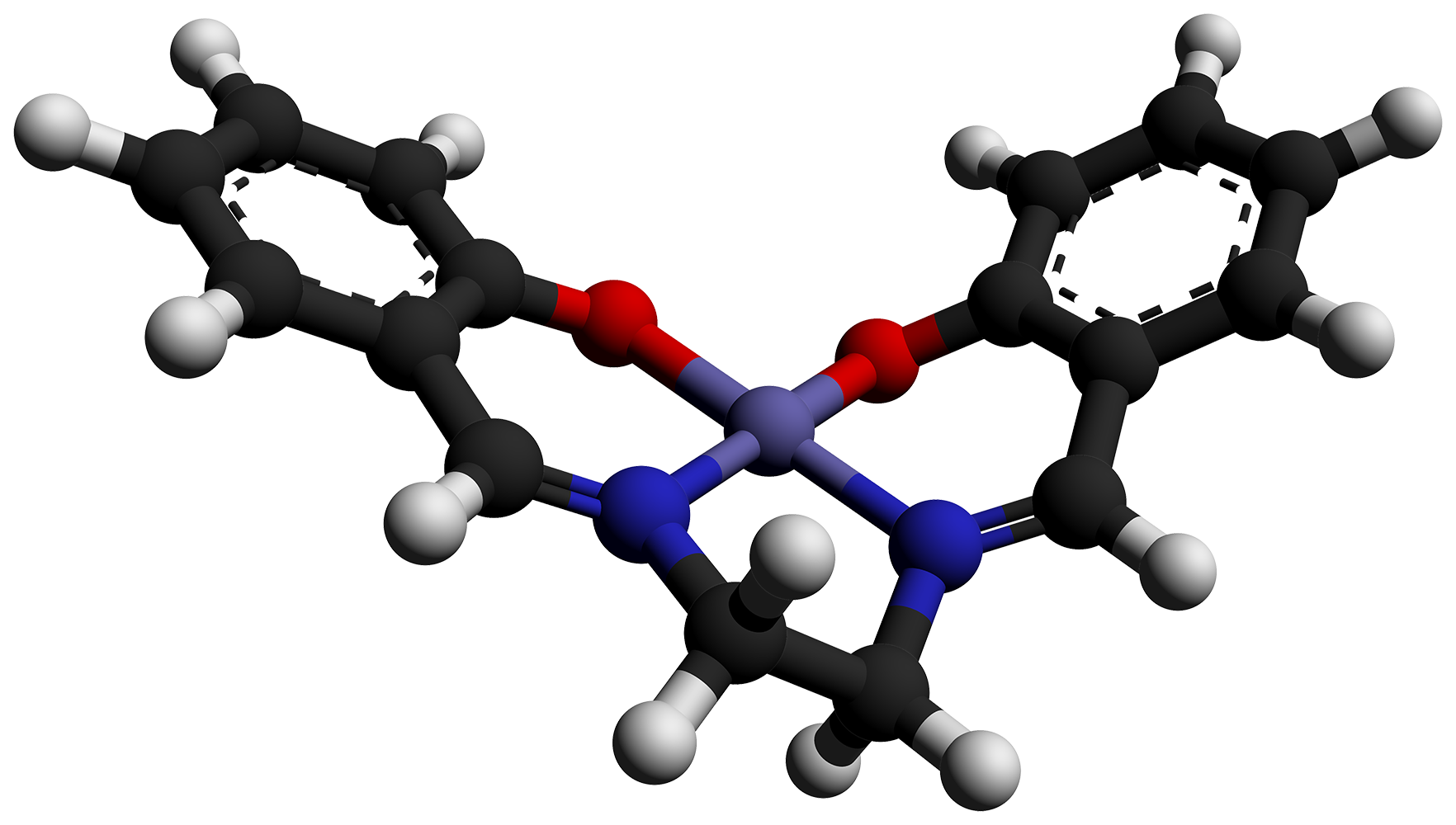

Names
- Other names: N,N′-Bis(salicylidene)ethylenediaminocobalt(II); Co(salen)

Identifiers
CAS Number	14167-18-1
3D model (JSmol)	ionic form: Interactive image; coordination form: Interactive image
ChemSpider	24701
ECHA InfoCard	100.034.541
PubChem CID	26517
UNII	N2O9115YTK
CompTox Dashboard (EPA)	DTXSID1065718
- InChI: InChI=1S/C16H16N2O2.Co/c19-15-7-3-1-5-13(15)11-17-9-10-18-12-14-6-2-4-8-16(14)20;/h1-8,11-12,19-20H,9-10H2;/q;+2/p-2/b17-11+,18-12+; Key: NPAQSKHBTMUERN-OYJDLGDISA-L
- SMILES: ionic form: c1cc(c(cc1)[O-])/C=N/CC/N=C/c2c(cccc2)[O-].[Co+2]; coordination form: C1C[N+]2=Cc0ccccc0O[Co-2]23Oc0ccccc0C=[N+]13

Properties
Chemical formula	C_{16}H_{14}CoN_{2}O_{2}
Molar mass	325.233 g·mol^{−1}

Hazards
- GHS labelling
Pictograms	(GHS07: Exclamation mark)
Signal word	Warning
Hazard statements	H315, H319, H335
Precautionary statements	P261, P264, P271, P280, P304+P340+P312, P332+P313, P337+P313, P362+P364, P403+P233, P501
Safety data sheet (SDS)	Oxford MSDS
- Except where otherwise noted, data are given for materials in their standard state (at 25 °C [77 °F], 100 kPa). verify (what is ?) Infobox references

Salcomine is a coordination complex derived from the salen ligand and cobalt. The complex, which is planar, and a variety of its derivatives are carriers for O_{2} as well as oxidation catalysts.

== Preparation and structure ==
Salcomine is commercially available. It may be synthesized from cobalt(II) acetate and salenH_{2}.

Salcomine crystallizes as a dimer. In this form, the cobalt centers achieve five-coordination via a bridging phenolate ligands. A monomeric form crystallizes with chloroform in the lattice. It features planar Co centers. Salcomine is both a Lewis acid and a reductant. Several solvated derivatives bind O_{2} to give derivatives of the type (μ-O_{2})[Co(salen)py]_{2} and [Co(salen)py(O_{2})].

== Applications ==
Structure of [Co(salen)(dmf)]_{2}O_{2}

The 1938 report that this compound reversibly bound O_{2} led to intensive research on this and related complexes for the storage or transport of oxygen. Solvated derivatives of salcomine, e.g. the chloroformate or the DMF adduct, bind 0.5 equivalent of O_{2}:

2 Co(salen) + O_{2} → [Co(salen)]_{2}O_{2}

Salcomine catalyzes the oxidation of 2,6-disubstituted phenols by dioxygen.
