= Metal deactivator =

Salen is a typical metal-deactivator.

Metal deactivators, or metal deactivating agents (MDA) are fuel additives and oil additives used to stabilize fluids by deactivating (usually by sequestering) metal ions, mostly introduced by the action of naturally occurring acids in the fuel and acids generated in lubricants by oxidative processes with the metallic parts of the systems. Fuels desulfurized by copper sweetening also contain a significant trace amounts of copper.

Metal deactivators inhibit the catalytic effects of such ions, especially copper, retarding the formation of gummy residues (e.g. gels containing copper mercaptide). Even concentrations of copper as low as 0.1 ppm can have detrimental effects.

An example of a metal deactivator used for gasoline and jet fuels is salen. It is used in turbine and jet fuels, diesel, heating oil, and greases. It is approved for military and commercial aviation fuels. Benzotriazole and its various derivatives are also common in lubricant formulas.

== See also ==
- Oil additive
- Sequestrant
- Corrosion inhibitor
