= Manganese acetate =

Manganese acetate can refer to:

- Manganese(II) acetate
- Manganese(III) acetate
