= Copper sweetening =

Petroleum refining process

Copper sweetening is a petroleum refining process using a slurry of clay and cupric chloride to oxidize mercaptans. The resulting disulfides are less odorous and usually very viscous, and are usually removed from the lower-boiling fractions and left in the heavy fuel oil fraction.

Copper sweetening introduces trace amount of copper into the resulting products, which tends to have detrimental effects as it leads to formation of gummy residues. Other sources of copper include contact with refinery parts made of copper and copper alloys. Copper is one of the most active instability promoters, and concentrations as low as 0.1 ppm can have marked negative effect. To combat these, metal deactivators are added to some fuels.

== See also ==
- Sour crude oil
- Sweet crude oil
