= Jacobsen epoxidation =

Chemical reaction

Named after	Eric N. Jacobsen
Reaction type	Ring forming reaction

Identifiers
Organic Chemistry Portal	jacobsen-katsuki-epoxidation
RSC ontology ID	RXNO:0000686

Jacobsen's catalysts R = Alkyl, O-alkyl, O-trialkyl Best Jacobsen catalyst: R = ^{t}Bu

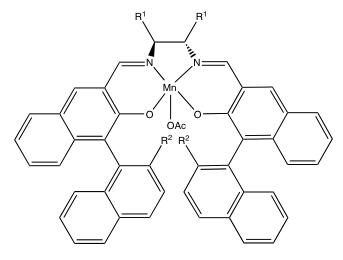
Katsuki's catalysts R^{1} = Aryl, substituted aryl R^{2} = Aryl, Alkyl

The Jacobsen epoxidation, sometimes also referred to as Jacobsen-Katsuki epoxidation is a chemical reaction which allows enantioselective epoxidation of unfunctionalized alkyl- and aryl- substituted alkenes. It is complementary to the Sharpless epoxidation (used to form epoxides from the double bond in allylic alcohols). The Jacobsen epoxidation gains its stereoselectivity from a C_{2} symmetric manganese(III) salen-like ligand, which is used in catalytic amounts. The manganese atom transfers an oxygen atom from chlorine bleach or similar oxidant. The reaction takes its name from its inventor, Eric Jacobsen, with Tsutomu Katsuki sometimes being included. Chiral-directing catalysts are useful to organic chemists trying to control the stereochemistry of biologically active compounds and develop enantiopure drugs.

Several improved procedures have been developed.

A general reaction scheme follows:

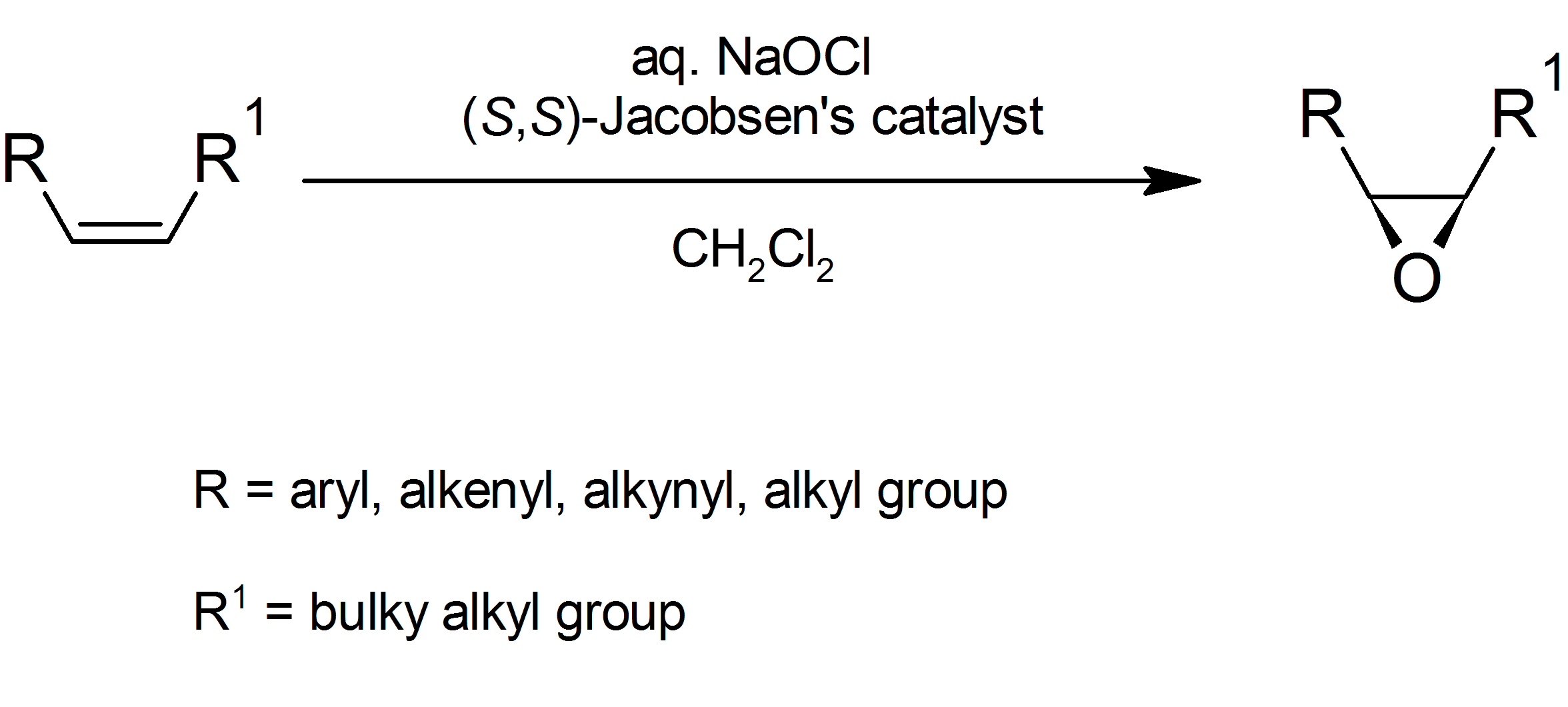

== History ==
In the early 1990s, Jacobsen and Katsuki independently released their initial findings about their catalysts for the enantioselective epoxidation of isolated alkenes. In 1991, Jacobsen published work where he attempted to perfect the catalyst. He was able to obtain ee values above 90% for a variety of ligands. Also, the amount of catalyst used was no more than 15% of the amount of alkene used in the reaction.

== General features ==
The degree of enantioselectivity depends on numerous factors, namely the structure of the alkene, the nature of the axial donor ligand on the active oxomanganese species and the reaction temperature. Cyclic and acyclic cis-1,2-disubstituted alkenes are epoxidized with almost 100% enantioselectivity whereas trans-1,2-disubstituted alkenes are poor substrates for Jacobsen's catalysts but yet give higher enantioselectivities when Katsuki's catalysts are used. Furthermore, the enantioselective epoxidation of conjugated dienes is much higher than that of the nonconjugated dienes.

The enantioselectivity is explained by either a "top-on" approach (Jacobsen) or by a "side-on" approach (Katsuki) of the alkene.

== Mechanism ==
The mechanism of the Jacobsen–Katsuki epoxidation is not fully understood, but most likely a manganese(V)-species (similar to the ferryl intermediate of Cytochrome P450) is the reactive intermediate which is formed upon the oxidation of the Mn(III)-salen complex. There are three major pathways. The concerted pathway, the metalla oxetane pathway and the radical pathway. The most accepted mechanism is the concerted pathway mechanism. After the formation of the Mn(V) complex, the catalyst is activated and therefore can form epoxides with alkenes. The alkene comes in from the "top-on" approach (above the plane of the catalyst) and the oxygen atom now is bonded to the two carbon atoms (previously C=C bond) and is still bonded to the manganese metal. Then, the Mn–O bond breaks and the epoxide is formed. The Mn(III)-salen complex is regenerated, which can then be oxidized again to form the Mn(V) complex.

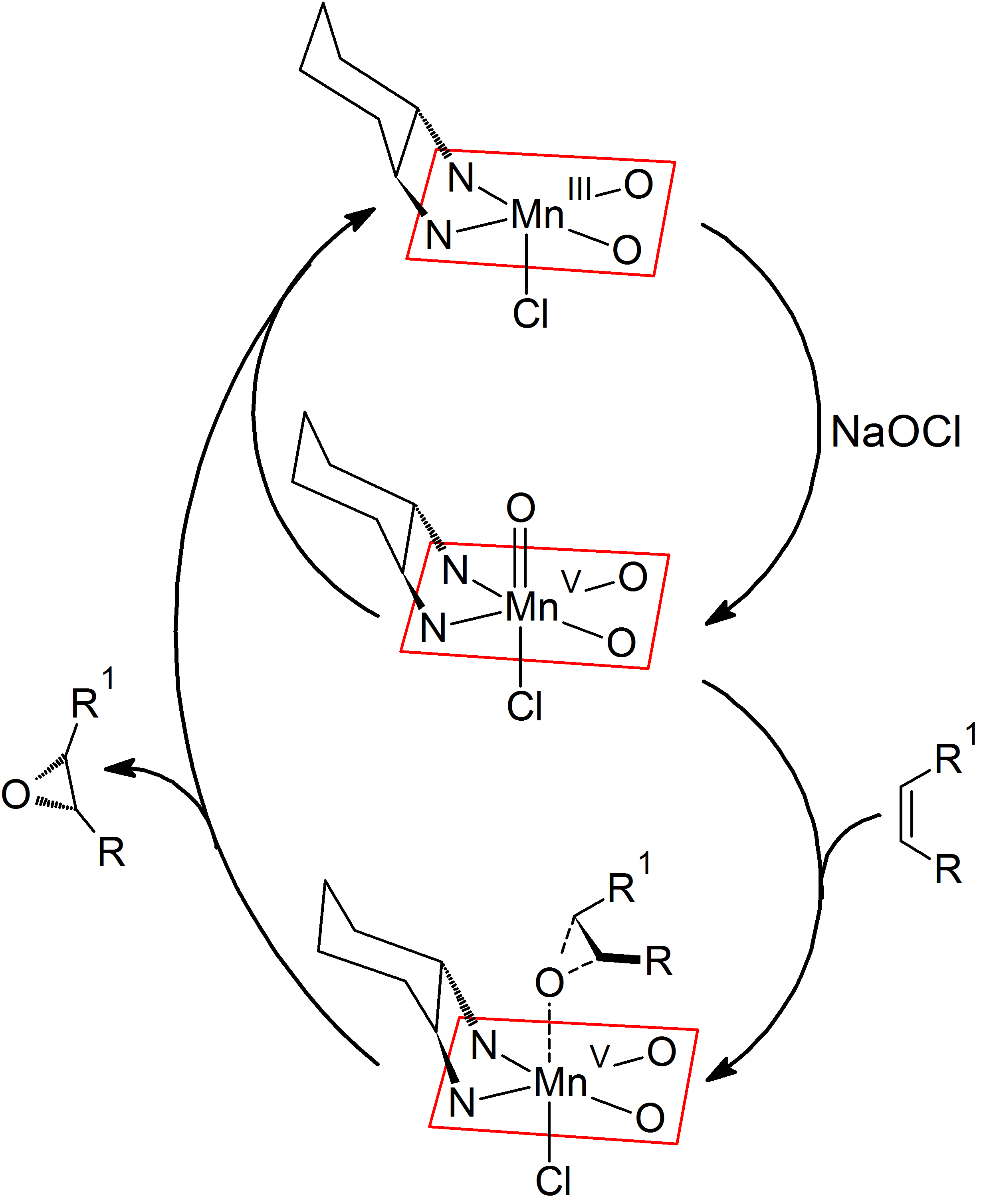
Mechanism of the Jacobsen catalytic enantioselective epoxidation

The radical intermediate accounts for the formation of mixed epoxides when conjugated dienes are used as substrates.

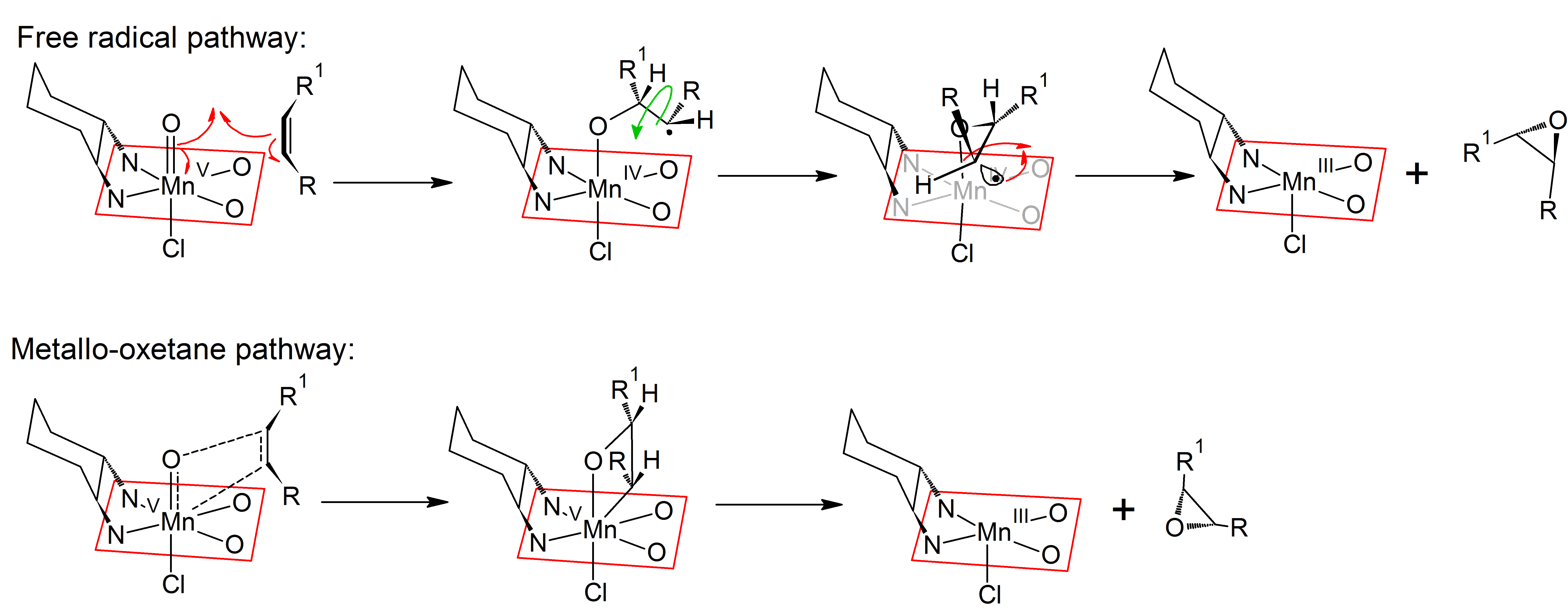
Mechanisms of the free-radical and metallo-oxetane pathways of the Jacobsen-Katsuki reaction

Dimethyldioxirane can be used as a source of O atoms. DMD of a chiral metal catalyst followed by epoxidation, or (2) epoxidation by chiral dioxiranes, which are generated in situ from a catalytic amount of ketone and a stoichiometric amount of a terminal oxidant). Mn-salen complexes have been used with success to accomplish the first strategy.

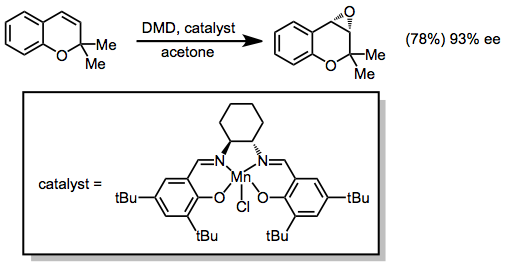
