= Diethyl tartrate =

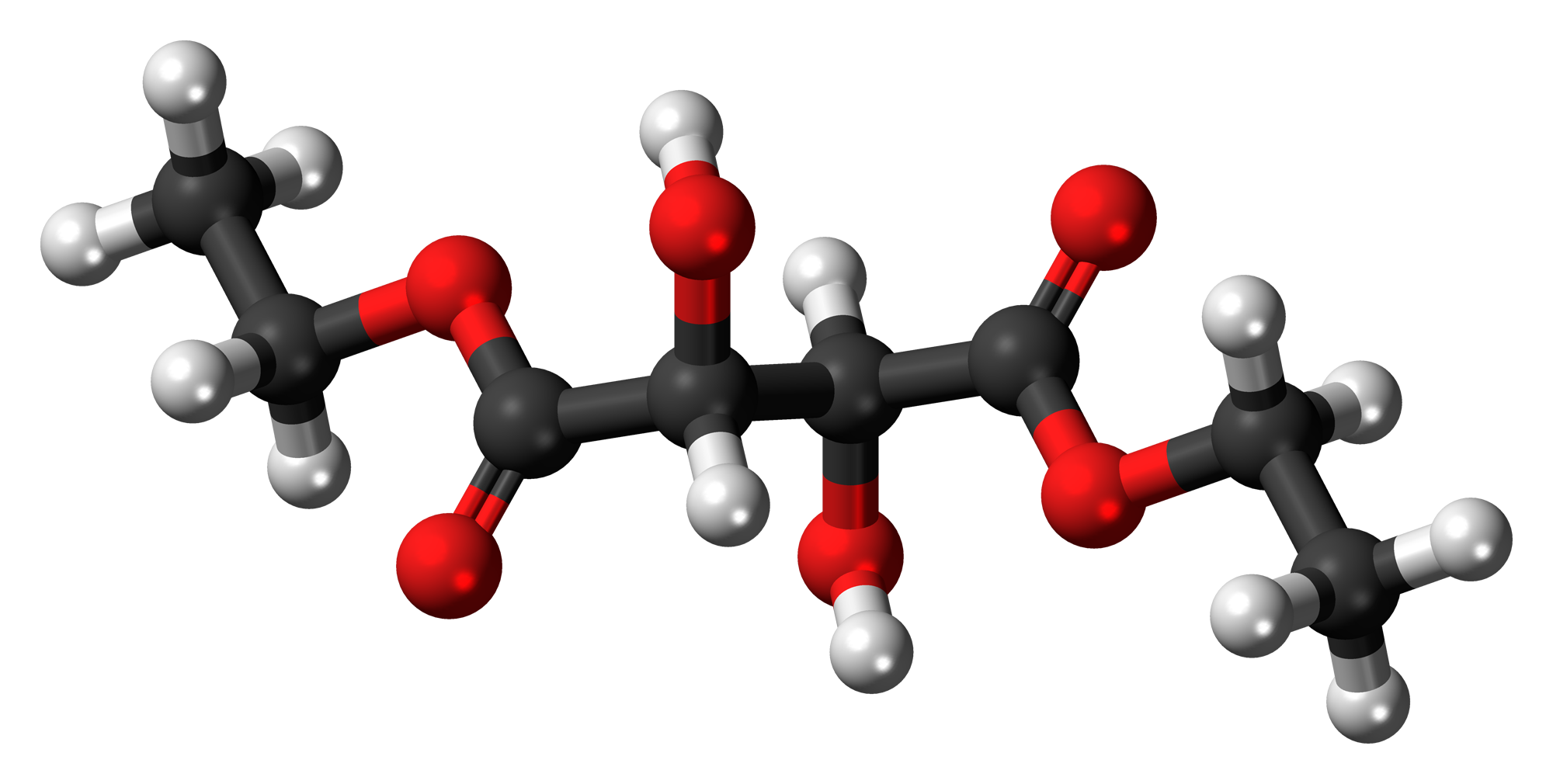

Names
- Preferred IUPAC name Diethyl 2,3-dihydroxybutanedioate
- Other names Diethyl 2,3-dihydroxysuccinate

Identifiers
CAS Number	408332-88-7; 87-91-2 (R,R)-(+)-L; 13811-71-7 (S,S)-(−)-D; 57968-71-5 (D/L); 21066-72-8 meso
3D model (JSmol)	Interactive image
ChemSpider	104927
PubChem CID	62333
UNII	OQ72CPY58Z (R,R)-(+)-L
CompTox Dashboard (EPA)	DTXSID70859148
- InChI: InChI=1S/C8H14O6/c1-3-13-7(11)5(9)6(10)8(12)14-4-2/h5-6,9-10H,3-4H2,1-2H3/t5-,6-/m0/s1 Key: YSAVZVORKRDODB-WDSKDSINSA-N; InChI=1/C8H14O6/c1-3-13-7(11)5(9)6(10)8(12)14-4-2/h5-6,9-10H,3-4H2,1-2H3/t5-,6-/m0/s1 Key: YSAVZVORKRDODB-WDSKDSINBN
- SMILES: O=C(OCC)[C@@H](O)[C@H](O)C(=O)OCC

Properties
Chemical formula	C_{8}H_{14}O_{6}
Molar mass	206.194 g·mol^{−1}
Appearance	Colorless liquid
Density	1.204 g/mL
Melting point	17 °C (63 °F; 290 K)
Boiling point	280 °C (536 °F; 553 K)
Solubility in water	low
Magnetic susceptibility (χ)	−113.4·10^{−6} cm^{3}/mol

Hazards
Safety data sheet (SDS)	Diethyl D-Tartrate MSDS
- Except where otherwise noted, data are given for materials in their standard state (at 25 °C [77 °F], 100 kPa). verify (what is ?) Infobox references

Diethyl tartrate is an organic compound with the formula (HOCHCO_{2}Et)_{2} (Et = ethyl). Three stereoisomers exist, R,R-, S,S-, and R,S (=S,R-). They are the ethyl esters of the respective R,R-, S,S-, and R,S-tartaric acids. The R,R- and S,S- isomers are enantiomeric, being mirror images. The meso stereoisomer is not chiral. The chiral isomer is far more common.

In the Sharpless epoxidation, diethyl tartrate and titanium isopropoxide form a chiral catalyst in situ. The TADDOL ligand scaffold is produced from diethyl tartrate.
