= Coprinol =

Names
- Preferred IUPAC name 6-(2-Hydroxyethyl)-2,2,5,7-tetramethyl-2,3-dihydro-1H-inden-4-ol

Identifiers
CAS Number	1197922-03-4
3D model (JSmol)	Interactive image
ChEMBL	ChEMBL1075969
ChemSpider	24680015
PubChem CID	42608175
UNII	B82T7PI9DE
CompTox Dashboard (EPA)	DTXSID601028194
- InChI: InChI=1S/C15H22O2/c1-9-11(5-6-16)10(2)14(17)13-8-15(3,4)7-12(9)13/h16-17H,5-8H2,1-4H3 Key: GCMUHPCLXBXQDH-UHFFFAOYSA-N; InChI=1/C15H22O2/c1-9-11(5-6-16)10(2)14(17)13-8-15(3,4)7-12(9)13/h16-17H,5-8H2,1-4H3 Key: GCMUHPCLXBXQDH-UHFFFAOYAD
- SMILES: CC1=C2CC(CC2=C(C(=C1CCO)C)O)(C)C

Properties
Chemical formula	C_{15}H_{22}O_{2}
Molar mass	234.339 g·mol^{−1}
- Except where otherwise noted, data are given for materials in their standard state (at 25 °C [77 °F], 100 kPa). Infobox references

Coprinol is an antibiotic isolated from Coprinus.
