= Schiff base =

Organic compound containing the group >C=N–

General structure of an imine. Schiff bases are imines in which R^{3} is an alkyl or aryl group (not a hydrogen). R^{1} and R^{2} may be hydrogens

General structure of an azomethine compound

In organic chemistry, a Schiff base (named after Hugo Schiff) is a compound with the general structure R^{1}R^{2}C=NR^{3} (R^{3} = alkyl or aryl, but not hydrogen). They can be considered a sub-class of imines, being either secondary ketimines or secondary aldimines depending on their structure. Anil refers to a common subset of Schiff bases: imines derived from anilines. The term can be synonymous with azomethine which refers specifically to secondary aldimines (i.e. R−CH=NR' where R' ≠ H).

== Synthesis ==
Schiff bases can be synthesized from an aliphatic or aromatic amine and a carbonyl compound by nucleophilic addition forming a hemiaminal, followed by a dehydration to generate an imine. In a typical reaction, 4,4'-oxydianiline reacts with o-vanillin:

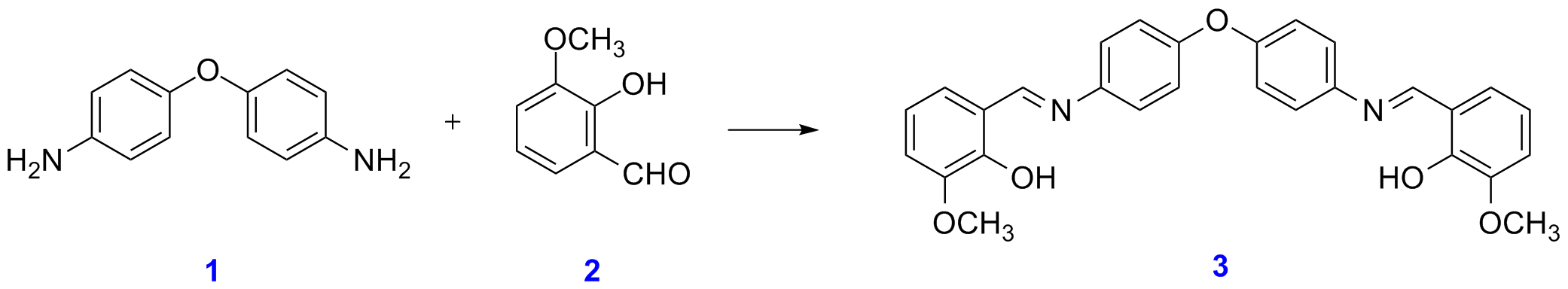
A mixture of 4,4'-oxydianiline 1 (1.00 g, 5.00 mmol) and o-vanillin 2 (1.52 g, 10.0 mmol) in methanol (40.0 ml) is stirred at room temperature for one hour to give an orange precipitate and after filtration and washing with methanol to give the pure Schiff base 3 (2.27 g, 97%)

Schiff bases can also be synthesized via the Aza-Wittig reaction.

== Biochemistry ==
Schiff bases have been investigated in relation to a wide range of contexts, including antimicrobial, antiviral and anticancer activity. They have also been considered for the inhibition of amyloid-β aggregation.

Schiff bases are common enzymatic intermediates where an amine, such as the terminal group of a lysine residue, reversibly reacts with an aldehyde or ketone of a cofactor or substrate. The common enzyme cofactor pyridoxal phosphate (PLP) forms a Schiff base with a lysine residue and is transaldiminated to the substrate(s). Similarly, the cofactor retinal forms a Schiff base in rhodopsins, including human rhodopsin (via Lysine 296), which is key in the photoreception mechanism.

== Coordination chemistry ==
The term Schiff base is normally applied to these compounds when they are being used as ligands to form coordination complexes with metal ions. One example is Jacobsen's catalyst. The imine nitrogen is basic and exhibits pi-acceptor properties. Several, especially the diiminopyridines are noninnocent ligands. Many Schiff base ligands are derived from alkyl diamines and aromatic aldehydes.

Schiff base ligands
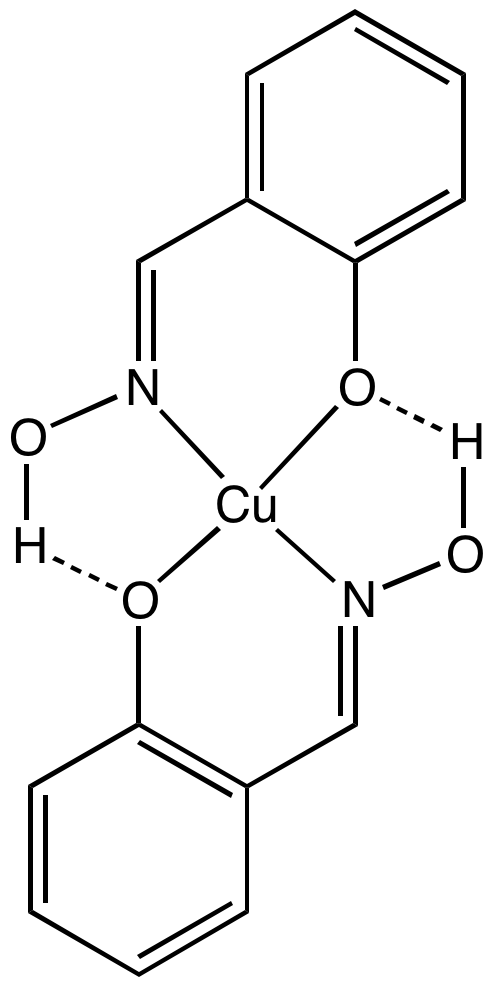
Copper(II) complex of the Schiff base ligand salicylaldoxime.

Salen is a common tetradentate ligand that becomes deprotonated upon complexation.

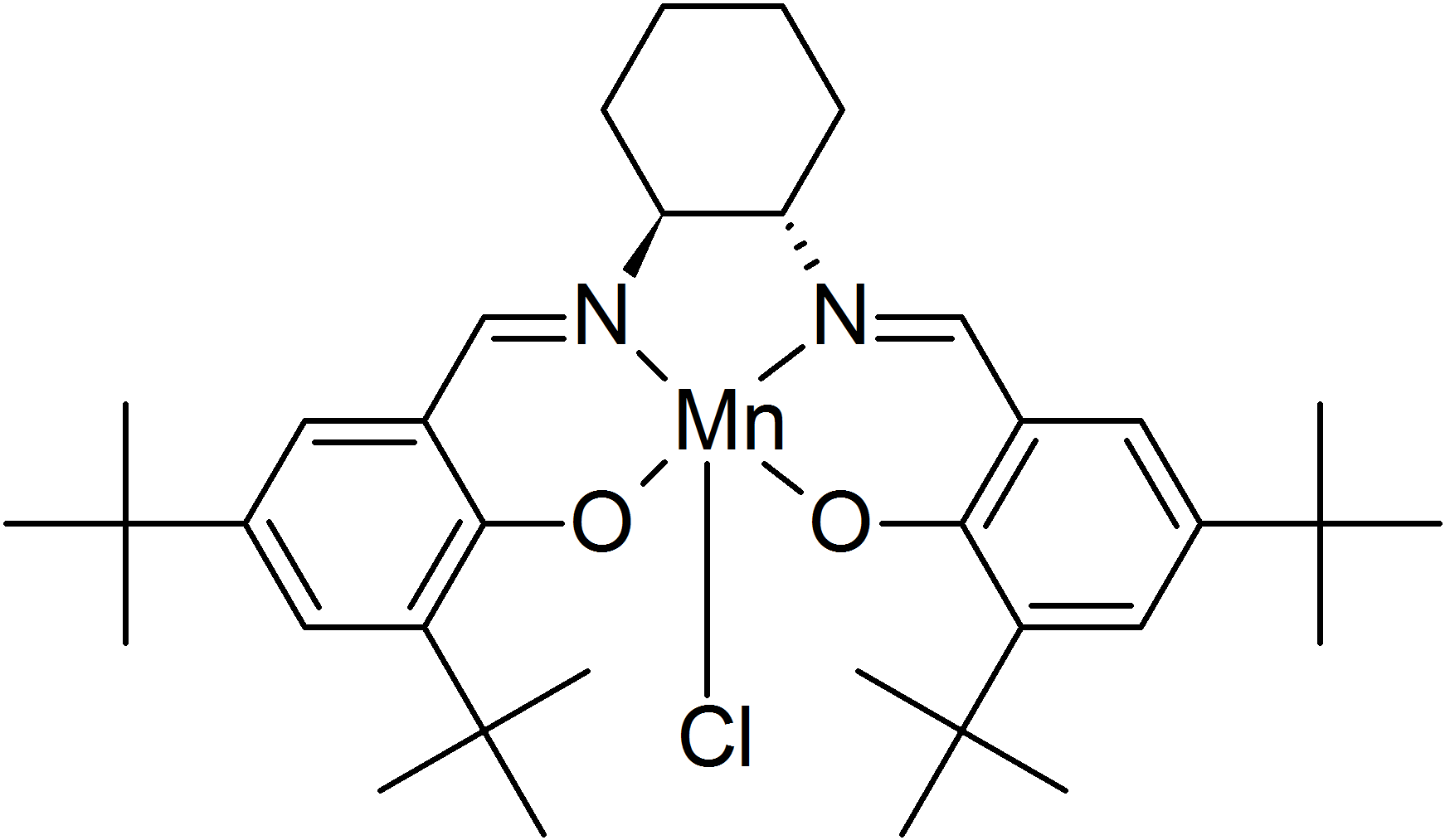
Jacobsen's catalyst is derived from a chiral salen ligand.

Generic diiminopyridine complex

Chiral Schiff bases were one of the first ligands used for asymmetric catalysis. In 1968 Ryōji Noyori developed a copper-Schiff base complex for the metal-carbenoid cyclopropanation of styrene. Schiff bases have also been incorporated into metal–organic frameworks (MOF).

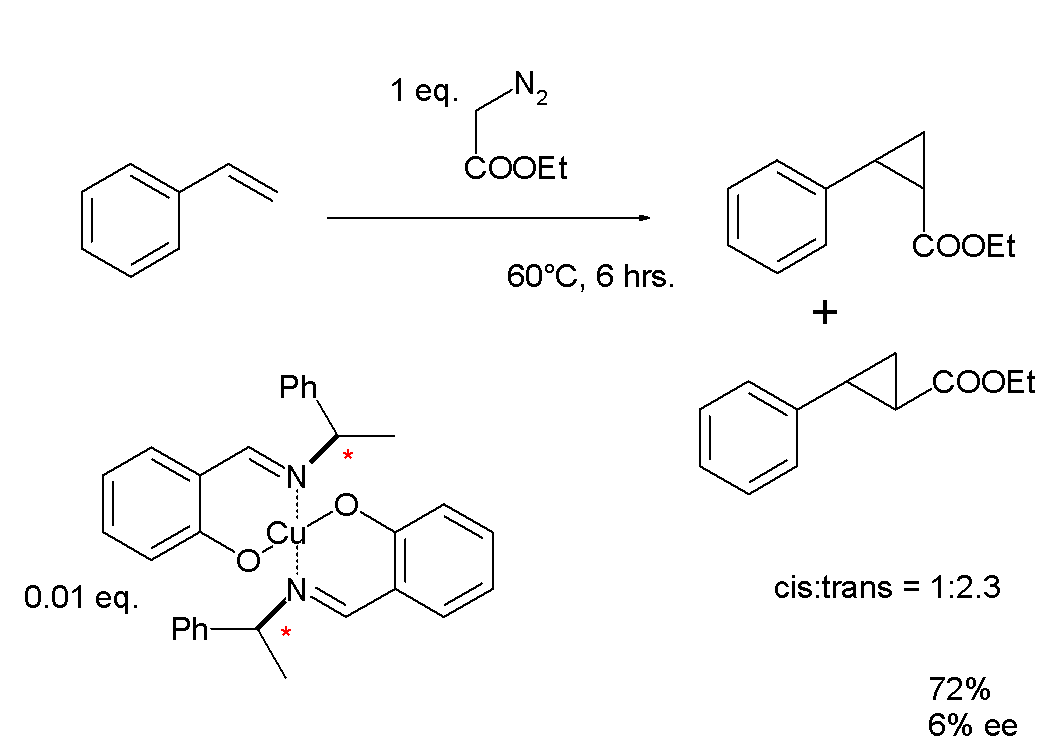

== Conjugated Schiff bases ==
Conjugated Schiff bases absorb strongly in the UV-visible region of the electromagnetic spectrum. This absorption is the basis of the anisidine value, which is a measure of oxidative spoilage for fats and oils.

== Historic references ==
- Schiff, Hugo (1864). "Mittheilungen aus dem Universitäts-laboratorium in Pisa: 2. Eine neue Reihe organischer Basen" [Communications from the university laboratory in Pisa: 2. A new series of organic bases]. Annalen der Chemie und Pharmacie (in German). 131: 118–119. doi:10.1002/jlac.18641310113.
- Schiff, Hugo (1866). "Sopra una nova serie di basi organiche" [On a new series of organic bases]. Giornale di Scienze Naturali ed Economiche (in Italian). 2: 201–257.
- Schiff, Hugo (1866). "Eine neue Reihe organischer Diamine" [A new series of organic diamines]. Annalen der Chemie und Pharmacie, Supplementband (in German). 3: 343–370.
- Schiff, Hugo (1866). "Eine neue Reihe organischer Diamine. Zweite Abtheilung" [A new series of organic diamines. Second part.]. Annalen der Chemie und Pharmacie (in German). 140: 92–137. doi:10.1002/jlac.18661400106.
