= Sharpless epoxidation =

Chemical reaction

Named after	Karl Barry Sharpless
Reaction type	Ring forming reaction

Identifiers
Organic Chemistry Portal	sharpless-epoxidation
RSC ontology ID	RXNO:0000141

The Katsuki-Sharpless epoxidation reaction is an enantioselective chemical reaction to prepare 2,3-epoxyalcohols from primary and secondary allylic alcohols. The oxidizing agent is tert-butyl hydroperoxide. The method relies on a catalyst formed from titanium tetra(isopropoxide) and diethyl tartrate.

The Sharpless epoxidation

2,3-Epoxyalcohols can be converted into diols, aminoalcohols, and ethers. The reactants for the Sharpless epoxidation are commercially available and relatively inexpensive. K. Barry Sharpless published a paper on the reaction in 1980 and was awarded the 2001 Nobel Prize in Chemistry for this and related work on asymmetric oxidations. The prize was shared with William S. Knowles and Ryōji Noyori.

== Catalyst ==
5–10 mol% of the catalyst is typical. The presence of 3Å molecular sieves (3Å MS) is necessary. The structure of the catalyst is uncertain although it is thought to be a dimer of [Ti(tartrate)(OR)_{2}], a proposed structure is shown below using the (+)-DET ligand.

Mechanism for the asymmetric epoxidation using (+)-DET.

== Selectivity ==
The epoxidation of allylic alcohols is a well-utilized conversion in fine chemical synthesis. The chirality of the product of a Sharpless epoxidation is sometimes predicted with the following mnemonic. A rectangle is drawn around the double bond in the same plane as the carbons of the double bond (the xy-plane), with the allylic alcohol in the bottom right corner and the other substituents in their appropriate corners. In this orientation, the (−) diester tartrate preferentially interacts with the top half of the molecule, and the (+) diester tartrate preferentially interacts with the bottom half of the molecule. This model seems to be valid despite substitution on the olefin. Selectivity decreases with larger R^{1}, but increases with larger R^{2} and R^{3} (see introduction).

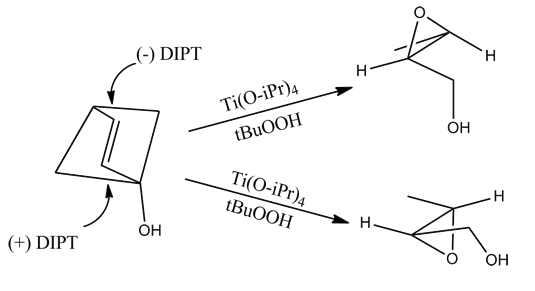
The Sharpless epoxidation

However, this method incorrectly predicts the product of allylic 1,2-diols.

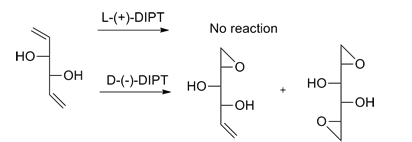
Sharpless model violation

== Kinetic resolution ==
The Sharpless epoxidation can also give kinetic resolution of a racemic mixture of secondary 2,3-epoxyalcohols. While the yield of a kinetic resolution process cannot be higher than 50%, the enantiomeric excess approaches 100% in some reactions.

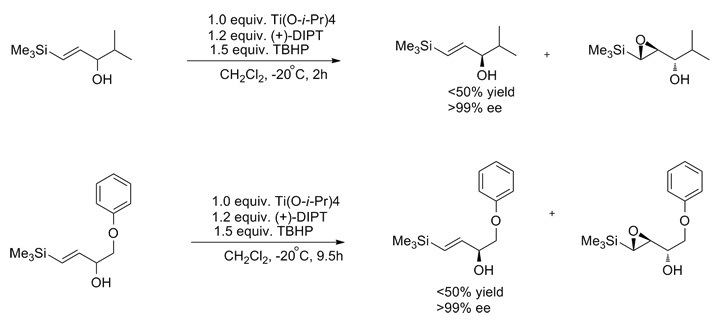
Kinetic resolution

== Synthetic utility ==
The Sharpless epoxidation is viable with a large range of primary and secondary alkenic alcohols. Furthermore, with the exception noted above, a given dialkyl tartrate will preferentially add to the same face independent of the substitution on the alkene.To demonstrate the synthetic utility of the Sharpless epoxidation, the Sharpless group created synthetic intermediates of various natural products: methymycin, erythromycin, leukotriene C-1, and (+)-disparlure.

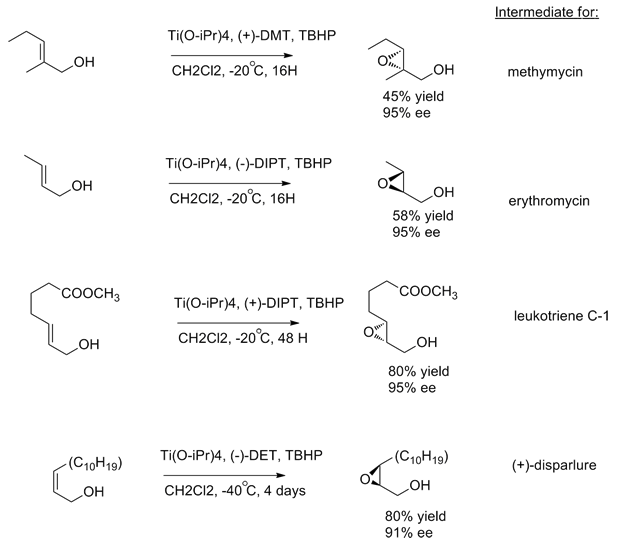
Utility

As one of the few highly enantioselective reactions during its time, many manipulations of the 2,3-epoxyalcohols have been developed.

The Sharpless epoxidation has been used for the total synthesis of various saccharides, terpenes, leukotrienes, pheromones, and antibiotics.

The main drawback of this protocol is the necessity of the presence of an allylic alcohol. The Jacobsen epoxidation, an alternative method to enantioselectively oxidise alkenes, overcomes this issue and tolerates a wider array of functional groups. For specifically glycidic epoxides, the Jørgensen-Córdova epoxidation avoids the need to reduce the carbonyl and then reoxidize, and has more efficient catalyst turnover.

== References of historic interest ==
- Katsuki, T.; K. Barry Sharpless (1980). "The first practical method for asymmetric epoxidation". J. Am. Chem. Soc. 102 (18): 5974. Bibcode:1980JAChS.102.5974K. doi:10.1021/ja00538a077.
- Gao, Y.; Hanson, R. M.; Klunder, J. M.; Ko, S. Y.; Masamune, H.; Sharpless, K. B. (1987). "Catalytic asymmetric epoxidation and kinetic resolution: Modified procedures including in situ derivatization". J. Am. Chem. Soc. 109 (19): 5765–5780. Bibcode:1987JAChS.109.5765G. doi:10.1021/ja00253a032.

== See also ==
- Asymmetric catalytic oxidation
- Juliá–Colonna epoxidation — for enones
- Jacobsen epoxidation — for unfunctionalized alkenes
