= Salen ligand =

Names
- Other names 2,2′-Ethylenebis(nitrilomethylidene)diphenol, N,N′-Ethylenebis(salicylimine)

Identifiers
CAS Number	129409-01-4; 94-93-9 (non-specific)
3D model (JSmol)	Interactive image
ChEMBL	ChEMBL594100
ChemSpider	10484366
ECHA InfoCard	100.002.161
EC Number	202-376-3
PubChem CID	26518
UNII	M122L9EGR6
CompTox Dashboard (EPA)	DTXSID5059113
- InChI: InChI=1S/C16H16N2O2/c19-15-7-3-1-5-13(15)11-17-9-10-18-12-14-6-2-4-8-16(14)20/h1-8,11-12,19-20H,9-10H2/b17-11+,18-12+ Key: VEUMANXWQDHAJV-JYFOCSDGSA-N
- SMILES: C1=CC=C(C(=C1)/C=N/CC/N=C/C2=CC=CC=C2O)O

Properties
Chemical formula	C_{16}H_{16}N_{2}O_{2}
Molar mass	268.32
Melting point	126 °C (259 °F; 399 K)

Hazards
- GHS labelling
Pictograms	(GHS07: Exclamation mark)
Signal word	Warning
Hazard statements	H315, H319, H335
Precautionary statements	P261, P264, P271, P280, P302+P352, P304+P340, P305+P351+P338, P312, P321, P332+P313, P337+P313, P362, P403+P233, P405, P501
- Except where otherwise noted, data are given for materials in their standard state (at 25 °C [77 °F], 100 kPa). verify (what is ?) Infobox references

Salen refers to a tetradentate C_{2}-symmetric ligand synthesized from salicylaldehyde (sal) and ethylenediamine (en). It may also refer to a class of compounds, which are structurally related to the classical salen ligand, primarily bis-Schiff bases. Salen ligands are notable for coordinating a wide range of different metals, which they can often stabilise in various oxidation states. For this reason salen-type compounds are used as metal deactivators. Metal salen complexes also find use as catalysts.

== Synthesis and complexation ==
H_{2}salen may be synthesized by the condensation of ethylenediamine and salicylaldehyde.

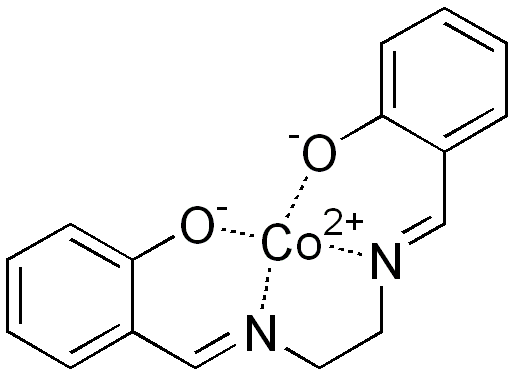
Salcomine, a complex of salen with cobalt

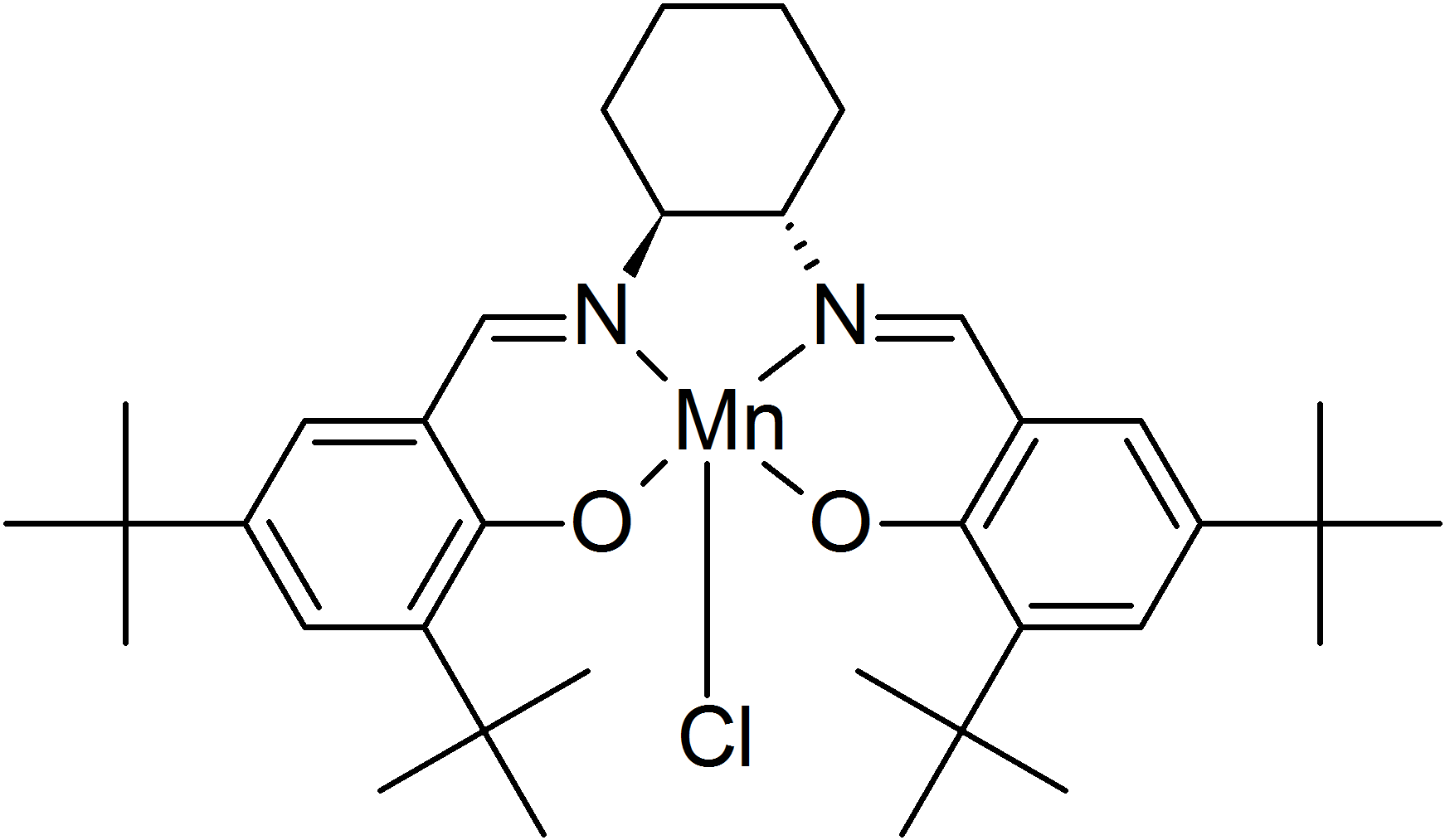
Jacobsen's salen-Mn catalyst

Complexes of salen with metal cations can often be made in situ, i.e., without isolating the H_{2}salen.

H_{2}salen + M^{2+} → M(salen) + 2 H^{+}

== See also ==
- Bisthiosemicarbazones, a structurally related class of C_{2}-symmetric imine based ligands
