= Octadecyl 3-(3,5-di-tert-butyl-4-hydroxyphenyl)propionate =

Names
- Other names: Stearyl 3-(3,5-di-tert-butyl-4-hydroxyphenyl)-propionate; Octadecyl 3-(3,5-di-tert-butyl-4-hydroxyphenyl)propanoate; Octadecyl 3,5-di-tert-butyl-4-hydroxyhydrocinnamate; 3,5-Di-tert-butyl-4-hydroxyphenylpropionic acid octadecyl ester; Antioxidant 1076; Trade names: Irganox 1076 (BASF); Anox PP18 (SI Group)

Identifiers
| CAS Number | 2082-79-3 |
| 3D model (JSmol) | Interactive image |
| ChemSpider | 15539 |
| ECHA InfoCard | 100.016.560 |
| EC Number | 218-216-0 |
| PubChem CID | 16386 |
| UNII | V88J661G2P |
| CompTox Dashboard (EPA) | DTXSID8027456 |
- InChI: InChI=1S/C35H62O3/c1-8-9-10-11-12-13-14-15-16-17-18-19-20-21-22-23-26-38-32(36)25-24-29-27-30(34(2,3)4)33(37)31(28-29)35(5,6)7/h27-28,37H,8-26H2,1-7H3 Key: nChIKey=SSDSCDGVMJFTEQ-UHFFFAOYSA-N
- SMILES: C(CC(OCCCCCCCCCCCCCCCCCC)=O)C1=CC(C(C)(C)C)=C(O)C(C(C)(C)C)=C1

Properties
| Chemical formula | C_{35}H_{62}O_{3} |
| Molar mass | 530.878 g·mol^{−1} |
| Appearance | White solid |
| Density | 1.012 |
| Melting point | 50–52 °C (122–126 °F; 323–325 K) |
| Boiling point | 323 °C (613 °F; 596 K) |
| Solubility in water | 2.85 µg/L |

Hazards
- GHS labelling
| Pictograms | (GHS07: Exclamation mark) |
| Signal word | Warning |
| Hazard statements | H315, H317, H319, H335, H413 |
| Precautionary statements | P261, P264, P264+P265, P271, P272, P273, P280, P302+P352, P304+P340, P305+P351+P338, P319, P321, P333+P317, P337+P317, P362+P364, P403+P233, P405, P501 |
- Except where otherwise noted, data are given for materials in their standard state (at 25 °C [77 °F], 100 kPa). Infobox references

Octadecyl 3-(3,5-di-tert-butyl-4-hydroxyphenyl)propionate is a hindered phenolic antioxidant commonly used as a polymer stabiliser.

== Synthesis ==
Base catalysed Michael addition of methyl acrylate to 2,6-di-tert-butylphenol forms the intermediate dibutyl-phloretic ester. High temperature transesterification of this with stearyl alcohol gives the final product.

== Applications ==
Octadecyl 3-(3,5-di-tert-butyl-4-hydroxyphenyl)propionate is significantly less volatile than simpler phenolic antioxidants such as butylhydroxytoluene (BHT). This makes it more suitable to stabilising plastics, as it is not driven out by the high temperatures experienced during plastic extrusion and moulding, when they are heated to 150-320 °C (300–600 °F). It is widely used in the commodity plastics, particularly in polyethylenes and polypropylene. It has approval for use in food contact materials, such as plastic food packaging in the EU and US, amongst others.

It is one of the most common polymer antioxidants, in part because of its comparatively low price. The stearyl tail reduces volatility and gives good chemical compatibility with plastics but contributes nothing to antioxidant performance. When higher performance is needed pentaerythritol tetrakis(3,5-di-tert-butyl-4-hydroxyhydrocinnamate) a common alternative.
