= Bis(2,4-di-tert-butylphenyl) pentaerythritol diphosphite =

Names
- Preferred IUPAC name 3,9-bis(2,4-di-tert-butylphenoxy)-2,4,8,10-tetraoxa-3,9-diphosphaspiro[5.5]undecane
- Other names Trade names: Irgafos 126 (BASF); ADK Stab PEP 24 (Adeka); Ultranox 626 (SI Group)

Identifiers
CAS Number	27676-62-6
3D model (JSmol)	Interactive image
ChemSpider	84048
ECHA InfoCard	100.043.578
EC Number	248-597-9
PubChem CID	93101
UNII	GV29P0K7AC
CompTox Dashboard (EPA)	DTXSID2027911
- InChI: InChI=1S/C33H50O6P2/c1-29(2,3)23-13-15-27(25(17-23)31(7,8)9)38-40-34-19-33(20-35-40)21-36-41(37-22-33)39-28-16-14-24(30(4,5)6)18-26(28)32(10,11)12/h13-18H,19-22H2,1-12H3 Key: InChIKey=AIBRSVLEQRWAEG-UHFFFAOYSA-N
- SMILES: O(P1OCC2(COP(OC3=C(C(C)(C)C)C=C(C(C)(C)C)C=C3)OC2)CO1)C4=C(C(C)(C)C)C=C(C(C)(C)C)C=C4

Properties
Chemical formula	C_{33}H_{50}O_{6}P_{2}
Molar mass	604.705 g·mol^{−1}
Appearance	White solid
Density	1.166 at 20°C
Melting point	172–179 °C (342–354 °F; 445–452 K)
Boiling point	311 °C (592 °F; 584 K)
Solubility in water	93.0 µg/L at 25°C

Hazards
- GHS labelling
Pictograms	(GHS09: Environmental hazard)
Signal word	Warning
Hazard statements	H410
Precautionary statements	P261, P264, P264+P265, P271, P273, P280, P302+P352, P304+P340, P305+P351+P338, P319, P321, P332+P317, P337+P317, P362+P364, P391, P403+P233, P405, P501
- Except where otherwise noted, data are given for materials in their standard state (at 25 °C [77 °F], 100 kPa). Infobox references

Bis(2,4-di-tert-butylphenyl) pentaerythritol diphosphite is an organophosphite used as a polymer stabilizer in plastics. Like other phosphite antioxidants it primarily acts to remove hydroperoxides and is typically used in combination with hindered phenolic antioxidants such as pentaerythritol tetrakis(3,5-di-tert-butyl-4-hydroxyhydrocinnamate).

== Synthesis ==
It is formed by a reaction between phosphorus trichloride, pentaerythritol and 2,4-di-tert-butylphenol. The poor solubility of pentererythritol can be an issue and non-nuncleophilic amines are often used to promote the reaction.

== Properties and applications ==
Compared to tris(2,4-di-tert-butylphenyl)phosphite (a common phosphite antioxidant) it has higher activity but lower stability against hydrolysis. Trace levels of amine bases are often added to commercial material to slow hydrolysis and increase storage life. Its crystal structure has been determined. It is compatible with a wide range of plastics including polyolefins, engineering plastics and polyurethane fibers. It is an approved food contact material in the US.
