= Tris(3,5-di-tert-butyl-4-hydroxybenzyl) isocyanurate =

Names
- Preferred IUPAC name 1,3,5-tris(3,5-di-tert-butyl-4-hydroxybenzyl)-1,3,5-triazine-2,4,6(1H,3H,5H)-trione
- Other names Chemical names: 1,3,5-Tris(4-hydroxy-3,5-di-tert-butylbenzyl)cyanuric acid; 1,3,5-Tris(3,5-di-tert-butyl-4-hydroxybenzyl) isocyanurate; Trade names: Irganox 3114 (BASF); Songnox 3114 (Songwon); Anox IC-14 (SI Group)

Identifiers
CAS Number	27676-62-6
3D model (JSmol)	Interactive image
ChemSpider	84061
ECHA InfoCard	100.044.165
EC Number	248-597-9
PubChem CID	93115
UNII	680V3MP8YT
CompTox Dashboard (EPA)	DTXSID0027935
- InChI: InChI=1S/C48H69N3O6/c1-43(2,3)31-19-28(20-32(37(31)52)44(4,5)6)25-49-40(55)50(26-29-21-33(45(7,8)9)38(53)34(22-29)46(10,11)12)42(57)51(41(49)56)27-30-23-35(47(13,14)15)39(54)36(24-30)48(16,17)18/h19-24,52-54H,25-27H2,1-18H3 Key: InChIKey=VNQNXQYZMPJLQX-UHFFFAOYSA-N
- SMILES: C(N1C(=O)N(CC2=CC(C(C)(C)C)=C(O)C(C(C)(C)C)=C2)C(=O)N(CC3=CC(C(C)(C)C)=C(O)C(C(C)(C)C)=C3)C1=O)C4=CC(C(C)(C)C)=C(O)C(C(C)(C)C)=C4

Properties
Chemical formula	C_{48}H_{69}N_{3}O_{6}
Molar mass	784.095 g·mol^{−1}
Appearance	White solid
Density	1.15
Melting point	219.4 °C (426.9 °F; 492.5 K)
Solubility in water	<0.04 mg/l at 20°C
- Except where otherwise noted, data are given for materials in their standard state (at 25 °C [77 °F], 100 kPa). Infobox references

Tris(3,5-di-tert-butyl-4-hydroxybenzyl) isocyanurate is a chemical compound used as a polymer stabilizer in plastics. Like other hindered phenols it acts as a primary antioxidant. More than 1000 tonnes per year are used in the EU.

== Synthesis ==
It is formed by the Mannich reaction of 2,6-di-tert-butylphenol, cyanuric acid, and formaldehyde.

== Properties and applications ==
Tris(3,5-di-tert-butyl-4-hydroxybenzyl) isocyanurate is a high molecular weight additive, with low volatility. It is well suited to stabilising polyolefins against degradation caused by long term heat aging. It is an approved food contact material in the US.

== See also ==
- 1,3,5-Tris(4-(tert-butyl)-3-hydroxy-2,6-dimethylbenzyl)-1,3,5-triazinane-2,4,6-trione - related phenolic antioxidant with a cyanurate core
- Pentaerythritol tetrakis(3,5-di-tert-butyl-4-hydroxyhydrocinnamate) - a commonly used phenolic polymer stabiliser
