= 2,4-Di-tert-butylphenol =

Names
- Preferred IUPAC name 2,4-Di-tert-butylphenol
- Other names: 2,4-Bis(1,1-dimethylethyl)phenol; 2,4-Bis(tert-butyl)phenol; 2,4-Di-tert-butylhydroxybenzene

Identifiers
CAS Number	96-76-4
3D model (JSmol)	Interactive image
ChEBI	CHEBI:89188
ChEMBL	ChEMBL29873
ChemSpider	7037
ECHA InfoCard	100.002.303
EC Number	202-532-0
PubChem CID	7311
UNII	FOB94G6HZT
CompTox Dashboard (EPA)	DTXSID2026602
- InChI: InChI=1S/C14H22O/c1-13(2,3)10-7-8-12(15)11(9-10)14(4,5)6/h7-9,15H,1-6H3 Key: ICKWICRCANNIBI-UHFFFAOYSA-N
- SMILES: CC(C)(C)c1ccc(O)c(c1)C(C)(C)C

Properties
Chemical formula	C_{14}H_{22}O
Molar mass	206.329 g·mol^{−1}
Appearance	White crystalline solid
Odor	phenolic, medical
Density	0.887
Melting point	56.8 °C (134.2 °F; 329.9 K)
Boiling point	264.2 °C (507.6 °F; 537.3 K)
Solubility in water	33 mg/L at 25 °C, pH 6 - 7
Vapor pressure	5 Pa @ 38°C
Acidity (pK_{a})	11.6

Hazards
- GHS labelling
Pictograms	(GHS05: Corrosive) (GHS09: Environmental hazard)
Signal word	Warning
Hazard statements	H315, H318, H410
Precautionary statements	P264, P273, P280, P302+P352, P305+P351+P338, P310, P332+P313, P362, P391, P501
- Except where otherwise noted, data are given for materials in their standard state (at 25 °C [77 °F], 100 kPa). Infobox references

2,4-Di-tert-butylphenol (2,4-DTBP) is a white solid with a phenolic odour. It is primarily used as a raw material for the production of several commercially important antioxidants and phenolic benzotriazole-type UV absorbers. It also finds use as a starting material in the synthesis of agrochemicals, fragrances and catalysts (i.e. Jacobsen's catalyst).

Despite its toxicity against most tested organisms, it is made by a wide range of living organisms: 169 species of bacteria, fungi, plants, and animals.

== Synthesis ==
The butylation of phenol is typically achieved by a Friedel–Crafts alkylation with isobutylene catalysed by a strong acid. These acids can be either liquids like triflic acid, or solid acids such as zeolites. The isobutylene can be generated in situ by the dehydration of tert-butyl alcohol or methyl tert-butyl ether, which being liquids are simpler to handle than the highly flammable isobutylene gas.

== Applications ==
2,4-DTBP is used in the production of antioxidants like tris(2,4-di-tert-butylphenyl)phosphite and bis(2,4-di-tert-butylphenyl) pentaerythritol diphosphite.

== Phytopathogen defense ==
2,4-DTBP produced by phyllosphere-associated Aspergillus cvjetkovicii has been found to enhance the resistance of host rice cultivars to the fungal pathogen Rhizoctonia solani. Exogenous application of 2,4-DTBP has also been shown to provide similar protective effects against R. solani in cucumber, maize, soybean and tomato to varying degrees. 2,4-DTB's antioxidant activity has a direct scavenging effect on reactive oxygen species (ROS) in R. solani, leading to the repression of RsAMT1 (an ammonium transporter gene) transcription. RsAMT1 is essential for R. solani pathogenicity, hyphal growth and sclerotia formation. RsAMT1 is activated by RsbZIP, a transcription factor dependent on ROS homeostasis. ROS deficiency caused by 2,4-DTBP suppresses the transcriptional switch of the bZIP-AMT1 pathway, leading to a reduction in R. solani pathogenicity. Rice leaf cultivars enriched with Aspergillus cvjetkovicii and 2,4-DTBP demonstrate a reduced area of R. solani-associated necrotic lesions.

2,4-DTBP has shown defensive activity against other rice phytopathogens, including Fusarium fujikuroi, and is non-toxic to resistant host plants.

== See also ==
- 2,6-Di-tert-butylphenol
