= C22H29N3O =

The molecular formula C_{22}H_{29}N_{3}O (molar mass: 351.485 g/mol, exact mass: 351.2311 u) may refer to:

- DIPLA
- Etodesnitazene
- 6-Isopropyl-6-nor-lysergic acid diethylamide
- Lysergic acid dipropylamide
- PRO-LAD
- UV-328
