= Di-tert-butylphenol =

Di-tert-butylphenol may refer to:

- 2,4-Di-tert-butylphenol
- 2,6-Di-tert-butylphenol
