= Tert-Butylhydroquinone =

Antioxidant

tert-Butylhydroquinone
- Chemical structure of tert-butylhydroquinone

Names
- Preferred IUPAC name 2-tert-Butylbenzene-1,4-diol
- Other names TBHQ(i)

Identifiers
CAS Number	1948-33-0
3D model (JSmol)	Interactive image
ChEBI	CHEBI:78886
ChEMBL	ChEMBL242080
ChemSpider	15235
DrugBank	DB07726
ECHA InfoCard	100.016.139
EC Number	217-752-2
E number	E319 (antioxidants, ...)
PubChem CID	16043
UNII	C12674942B
CompTox Dashboard (EPA)	DTXSID6020220
- InChI: InChI=1S/C10H14O2/c1-10(2,3)8-6-7(11)4-5-9(8)12/h4-6,11-12H,1-3H3 Key: BGNXCDMCOKJUMV-UHFFFAOYSA-N; InChI=1/C10H14O2/c1-10(2,3)8-6-7(11)4-5-9(8)12/h4-6,11-12H,1-3H3 Key: BGNXCDMCOKJUMV-UHFFFAOYAP
- SMILES: Oc1ccc(O)cc1C(C)(C)C

Properties
Chemical formula	C_{10}H_{14}O_{2}
Molar mass	166.220 g·mol^{−1}
Appearance	Tan powder
Density	1.050 g/mL
Melting point	127 to 129 °C (261 to 264 °F; 400 to 402 K)
Boiling point	273 °C (523 °F; 546 K)
Solubility in water	Slightly soluble
Acidity (pK_{a})	10.80±0.18

Hazards
- Occupational safety and health (OHS/OSH)
Main hazards	Harmful
- GHS labelling
Pictograms	(GHS07: Exclamation mark) (GHS09: Environmental hazard)
Signal word	Warning
Hazard statements	H302, H312, H315, H317, H319, H335, H400
Precautionary statements	P261, P264, P270, P271, P272, P273, P280, P301+P312, P302+P352, P304+P340, P305+P351+P338, P312, P321, P322, P330, P332+P313, P333+P313, P337+P313, P362, P363, P391, P403+P233, P405, P501
Flash point	171 °C (340 °F; 444 K)
Safety data sheet (SDS)	External MSDS

Related compounds
Related compounds	Butylated hydroxyanisole (BHA); Butylated hydroxytoluene (BHT); 4-tert-Butylcatechol (TBC)
- Except where otherwise noted, data are given for materials in their standard state (at 25 °C [77 °F], 100 kPa). verify (what is ?) Infobox references

tert-Butylhydroquinone (TBHQ, tertiary butylhydroquinone, tBHQ) is a synthetic aromatic organic compound which is a type of phenol. It is a derivative of hydroquinone, substituted with a tert-butyl group.

== Applications ==
=== Food preservative ===
In foods, TBHQ is used as an antioxidant preservative for unsaturated vegetable oils and many edible animal fats. It does not cause discoloration even in the presence of iron, and does not change flavor or odor of the material to which it is added. It can be combined with other preservatives such as butylated hydroxyanisole (BHA). As a food additive, its E number is E319. It is added to a wide range of foods. Its primary advantage is extending storage life.

=== Other ===
In perfumery, it is used as a fixative to lower the evaporation rate and improve stability.

It is used industrially as a stabilizer to inhibit autopolymerization of organic peroxides.

It is used as an antioxidant in biodiesel.

Polaroid uses it as a photographic developer in their black and white and Reclaimed Blue films.

== Safety and regulation ==
The European Food Safety Authority (EFSA) and the United States Food and Drug Administration (FDA) have evaluated TBHQ and determined that it is safe to consume at the concentration allowed in foods. The FDA and European Union both set an upper limit of 0.02% (200 mg/kg) of the oil or fat content in foods. It has not been approved in Japan, hence import of food containing TBHQ for selling is not allowed in Japan as of 2007.

At very high doses, it has some negative health effects on lab animals, such as producing precursors to stomach tumors and damage to DNA. A number of studies have shown that prolonged exposure to very high doses of TBHQ may be carcinogenic, especially for stomach tumors. Other studies, however, have shown opposite effects, including inhibition against HCA-induced carcinogenesis (by depression of metabolic activation) for TBHQ and other phenolic antioxidants (TBHQ was one of several, and not the most potent) and reduction of nitrosamine-induced carcinogenesis (likely due to phase-II enzyme induction via Nrf2). The EFSA considers TBHQ to be noncarcinogenic. A 1986 review of scientific literature concerning the toxicity of TBHQ determined that a wide margin of safety exists between the levels of intake by humans and the doses that produce adverse effects in animal studies.

In addition, TBHQ has been identified by high-throughput screening as having potential immunotoxic effects in 2021. It was previously reported in 2014 that TBHQ enhances allergy response in mice by promoting Th2 cells through Nrf2.

Experiments on its genotoxicity at high doses are inconsistent. Its oxidized form TBBQ may be responsible for some toxic effects. There exists a wide margin of safety between food-additive doses and doses used in studies.

There have been reports of vision disturbances in individuals exposed to this chemical.
