= Polymer stabilizer =

Stabilizer added to polymeric materials

Polymer stabilizers (British English: polymer stabilisers) are chemical additives which may be added to polymeric materials to inhibit or retard their degradation. Mainly they protect plastic and rubber products against heat, oxidation, and UV light. The biggest quantity of stabilizers is used for polyvinyl chloride (PVC), as the production and processing of this type of plastic would not be possible without stabilizing chemicals. Common polymer degradation processes include oxidation, UV-damage, thermal degradation, ozonolysis, combinations thereof such as photo-oxidation, as well as reactions with catalyst residues, dyes, or impurities. All of these degrade the polymer at a chemical level, via chain scission, uncontrolled recombination and cross-linking, which adversely affects many key properties such as strength, malleability, appearance and colour.

Stabilizers are used at all stages of the polymer life-cycle. They allow plastic items to be produced faster and with fewer defects, extend their useful lifespan, and facilitate their recycling. However they also continue to stabilise waste plastic, causing it to remain in the environment for longer. Many different types of plastic exist and each may be vulnerable to several types of degradation, which usually results in several different stabilisers being used in combination. Even for objects made from the same type of plastic, different applications may have different stabilisation requirements. Regulatory considerations, such as food contact approval are also present. Environmentally friendly stabilizers for bioplastics should be made from bio-based materials, e.g. epoxidized soybean oil, and cause hardly any odor or VOC emissions. A wide range of stabilizers is therefore needed.

The market for antioxidant stabilisers alone was estimated at US$1.69 billion for 2017, with the total market for all polymer stabilizers expected to reach US$6.5 billion by 2033. In 2023, almost half of all polymer stabilizers sold worldwide were based on calcium, followed by lead (25.1 %), tin (15.4 %), liquid mixed metals (LMM) and other types.

== Antioxidants ==
Antioxidants inhibit autoxidation that occurs when polymers reacts with atmospheric oxygen. Aerobic degradation occurs gradually at room temperature, but almost all polymers are at risk of thermal-oxidation when they are processed at high temperatures. The molding or casting of plastics (e.g. injection molding) require them to be above their melting point or glass transition temperature (~200-300 °C). Under these conditions reactions with oxygen occur much more rapidly. Once initiated, autoxidation can be autocatalytic. As such, even though efforts are usually made to reduce oxygen levels, total exclusion is often not achievable and even exceedingly low concentrations of oxygen can be sufficient to initiate degradation. Sensitivity to oxidation varies significantly depending on the polymer in question; without stabilizers polypropylene and unsaturated polymers such as rubber will slowly degrade at room temperature where as polystyrene can be stable even at high temperatures. Antioxidants are of great importance during the process stage, with long-term stability at ambient temperature increasingly being supplied by hindered amine light stabilizers (HALs). Antioxidants are often referred to as being primary or secondary depending on their mechanism of action.

=== Primary antioxidants (radical scavengers) ===
Pentaerythritol tetrakis(3,5-di-tert-butyl-4-hydroxyhydrocinnamate): A primary antioxidant consisting of sterically hindered phenols with para-propionate groups.

Primary antioxidants (also known as chain-breaking antioxidants) act as radical scavengers and remove peroxy radicals (ROO•), as well as to a lesser extent alkoxy radicals (RO•), hydroxyl radicals (HO•) and alkyl radicals (R•). Oxidation begins with the formation of alkyl radicals, which are formed when the high temperatures and high shear stress experienced during processing snaps the polymer chains in a homolytic manner. These alkyl radicals react very rapidly with molecular oxygen (rate constants ≈ 10^{7}–10^{9} mol^{–1} s^{–1}) to give peroxy radicals, which in turn abstract hydrogen from a fresh section of polymer in a chain propagation step to give new alkyl radicals. The overall process is exceedingly complex and will vary between polymers but the first few steps are shown below in general:

R-R → 2 R•
R• + O_{2} → ROO•
ROO• + RH → ROOH + R•

Due to its rapid reaction with oxygen the scavenging of the initial alkyl radical (R•) is difficult and can only be achieved using specialised antioxidants the majority of primary antioxidants react instead with the longer lasting peroxy radicals (ROO•). Hydrogen abstraction is usually the rate determining step in the polymer degradation and the peroxy radicals can be scavenged by hydrogen donation from an alternative source, namely the primary antioxidant. This converts them into an organic hydroperoxide (ROOH). The most important commercial stabilizers for this are hindered phenols such as BHT or analogues thereof and secondary aromatic amines such as alkylated-diphenylamine. Amines are typically more effective, but cause pronounced discoloration, which is often undesirable (i.e., in food packaging, clothing). The overall reaction with phenols is shown below:

ROO• + ArOH → ROOH + ArO•
ArO• → nonradical products

The end products of these reactions are typically quinone methides, which may also impart unwanted colour. Modern phenolic antioxidants have complex molecular structures, often including a propionate-group at the para position of the phenol (i.e. they are ortho-alkylated analogues of phloretic acid). The quinone methides of these can rearrange once to give a hydroxycinnamate, regenerating the phenolic antioxidant group and allowing further radicals to be scavenged. Ultimately however, primary antioxidants are sacrificial and once they are fully consumed the polymer will begin to degrade.

=== Secondary antioxidants (hydroperoxides scavengers) ===
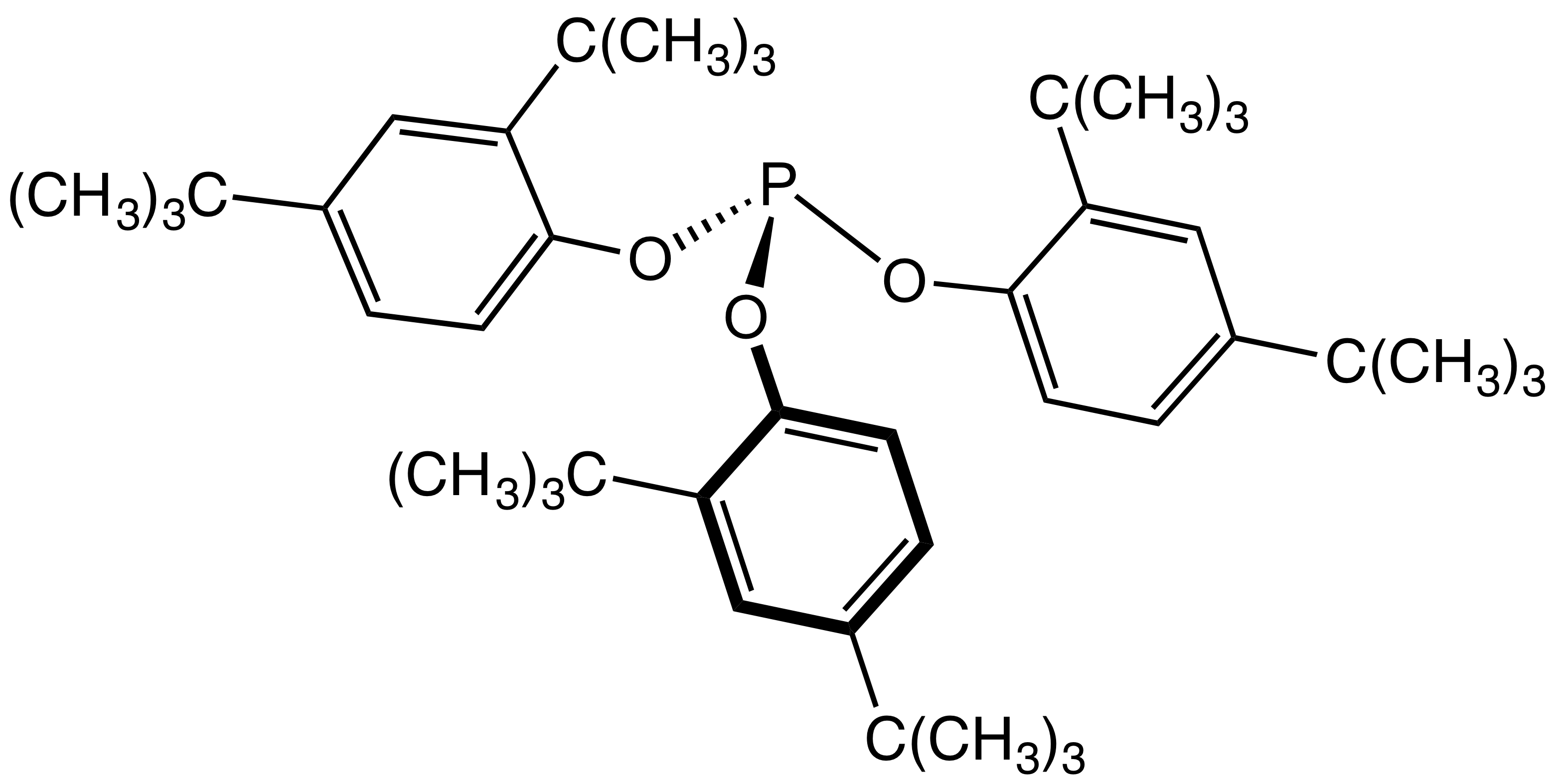
Tris(2,4-di-tert-butylphenyl)phosphite, a phosphite widely used as a secondary antioxidant in polymers.

Secondary antioxidants act to remove organic hydroperoxides (ROOH) formed by the action of primary antioxidants. Hydroperoxides are less reactive than radical species but can initiate fresh radical reactions:

ROOH + RH → RO• + R• + H_{2}O

As they are less chemically active they require a more reactive antioxidant. The most commonly employed class are phosphite esters, often of hindered phenols e.g. Tris(2,4-di-tert-butylphenyl)phosphite. These will convert polymer hydroperoxides to alcohols, becoming oxidized to organophosphates in the process:

ROOH + P(OR')_{3} → OP(OR')_{3} + ROH

Transesterification can then take place, in which the hydroxylated polymer is exchanged for a phenol:

ROH + OP(OR')_{3} → R'OH + OP(OR')_{2}OR

This exchange further stabilizes the polymer by releasing a primary antioxidant, because of this phosphites are sometimes considered multi-functional antioxidants as they can combine both types of activity. Organosulfur compounds are also efficient hydroperoxide decomposers, with thioethers being particularly effective against long-term thermal aging, they are ultimately oxidise up to sulfoxides and sulfones.

=== Antiozonant ===
6PPD is a p-phenylenediamine based antiozonant widely used in tires

Antiozonants prevent or slow down the degradation of material caused by ozone. This is naturally present in the air at very low concentrations but is exceedingly reactive, particularly towards unsaturated polymers such as rubber, where it causes ozone cracking. The mechanism of ozonolysis is different from other forms of oxidation and hence requires its own class of antioxidant stabilizers. These are primarily derivatives of p-phenylenediamine (PPD) and work by reacting with ozone faster than it can react with vulnerable functional groups in the polymer (typically alkene groups). They achieve this by having a low ionization energy which allows them to react with ozone via electron transfer, this converts them into radical cations that are stabilized by aromaticity. Such species remain reactive and will react further, giving products such as 1,4-benzoquinone, phenylenediamine-dimers and aminoxyl radicals. Some of these products can then be scavenged by antioxidants.

== Light stabilizers ==
Bisoctrizole: A benzotriazole-phenol based UV absorber

Light stabilizer are used to inhibit polymer photo-oxidation, which is the combined result of the action of light and oxygen. Like autoxidation this is a free radical process, hence the antioxidants described above are effective inhibiting agents, however additional classes of additives are also beneficial, such as UV absorbers, quenchers of excited states and HALS.

=== UV absorbers ===
UV susceptibility varies significantly between different polymers. Certain polycarbonates, polyesters and polyurethanes are highly susceptible, degrading via a Photo-Fries rearrangement. UV stabilisers absorb and dissipate the energy from UV rays as heat, typically by reversible intramolecular proton transfer. This reduces the absorption of UV rays by the polymer matrix and hence reduces the rate of weathering. Phenolic benzotriazoles (e.g. UV-360, UV-328) and hydroxyphenyl-triazines (e.g. Bemotrizinol) are used to stabilise polycarbonates and acrylics, oxanilides are used for polyamides and polyurethanes, while benzophenones are used for PVC.

Strongly light-absorbing PPS is difficult to stabilize. Even antioxidants fail in this electron-rich polymer. The acids or bases in the PPS matrix can disrupt the performance of the conventional UV absorbers such as HPBT. PTHPBT, which is a modification of HPBT are shown to be effective, even in these conditions.

=== Quenchers ===
A nickel-phenoxide quencher. CAS number: 14516-71-3

Photo-oxidation can begin with the absorption of light by a chromophore within the polymer (which may be a dye or impurity) causing it to enter an excited state. This can then react with ambient oxygen, converting it into highly reactive singlet oxygen. Quenchers are able to absorb energy from excited molecules via a Förster mechanism and then dissipate it harmlessly as either heat or lower frequency fluorescent light. Singlet oxygen can be quenched by metal chelates, with nickel phenolates being a common example. Nickel quenchers tend to be used in agricultural plastics such as plastic mulch.

=== Hindered amine light stabilizers ===
Example structure of a HAL

The ability of hindered amine light stabilizers (HALS or HAS) to scavenge radicals produced by weathering, may be explained by the formation of aminoxyl radicals through a process known as the Denisov Cycle. The aminoxyl radical (N-O•) combines with free radicals in polymers:

N-O• + R• → N-O-R

Although they are traditionally considered as light stabilizers, they can also stabilize thermal degradation.

Even though HALS are extremely effective in polyolefins, polyethylene and polyurethane, they are ineffective in polyvinyl chloride (PVC). It is thought that their ability to form nitroxyl radicals is disrupted. HALS act as a base and become neutralized by hydrochloric acid (HCl) that is released by photooxidation of PVC. The exception is the recently developed NOR HALS, which is not a strong base and is not deactivated by HCl.

== Other Classes ==
Polymers are susceptible to degradation by a variety of pathways beyond oxygen and light.

=== Acid Scavengers ===
Acid scavengers, also referred to as antacids, neutralize acidic impurities, especially those that release HCl. PVC is susceptible to acid-catalyzed degradation, the HCl being derived from the polymer itself. Ziegler–Natta catalysts and halogenated flame retardants also serve as sources of acids. Common acid scavengers include metallic soaps, such as calcium stearate and zinc stearate, mineral agents, such as hydrotalcite and hydrocalumite, and basic metal oxides, such as calcium oxide, zinc oxide or magnesium oxide.

=== Metal deactivators ===
Metal ions, such as those of Ti, Al and Cu, can accelerate the degradation of polymers. This is of particular concern where polymers are in direct contact with metal, such as in wiring and cable. More generally, the metal catalysts used to form the polymer may simply become encapsulated within it during production, this is typically true of Ziegler-Natta catalysts in polypropylene. In these instances metal deactivators may be added to improve stability. Deactivators work by chelation to form an inactive coordination complex with the metal ion. Salen-type compounds are common.

=== Thermal stabilizers ===
Thermal (or heat) stabilizers are used almost exclusively in PVC. At temperatures above 70 °C the unstabilized material is susceptible to degradation with loss of HCl. Once this dehydrochlorination starts it is autocatalytic, with rising acidity accelerating degradation. A wide range of agents have been used to prevent this, with many of the early agents such as lead stearate, organotins and cadmium complexes being highly toxic. Safer modern alternatives include metallic soaps such as calcium stearate, as well as barium and zinc compounds, along with various synergists. Addition levels vary typically from 2% to 4%.

=== Flame retardants ===
Flame retardants are a broad range of compounds that improve fire resistance of polymers. Examples include brominated compounds along with aluminium hydroxide, antimony trioxide, and various organophosphates. Flame retardants are known to reduce the effectiveness of antioxidants.

=== Biocides ===
Degradation resulting from microorganisms (biodegradation) involves its own class of special bio-stabilizers and biocides (e.g. isothiazolinones).

=== Voltage stabilizers ===
These additives are added to polymers used as sheathing for electrical cables, most commonly PEX. Compounds include benzil and thioxanthone derivatives. These possess high electron affinities, which allow them to trap and neutralize charge carriers that can cause dielectric breakdown of the insulation.

== See also ==
- Oil additives and fuel additives often include antioxidant stabilizers related to the ones discussed in this article
- Polymer degradation, polymer weathering and environmental stress cracking - discuss the natural degradation of polymers
- Chemically Assisted Degradation of Polymers and weather testing of polymers - discuss the accelerated degradation of polymers
- Biodegradable additives - are additives that enhance the biodegradation of polymers

Other additives

- Plasticizer
- Filler (materials)
- Plastic colorants
- Mold release agents
