= Aspergillus conicus =

Scientific classification
- Kingdom: Fungi
- Division: Ascomycota
- Class: Eurotiomycetes
- Order: Eurotiales
- Family: Aspergillaceae
- Genus: Aspergillus
- Species: A. conicus

Binomial name
- Aspergillus conicus Blochwitz (1914)

Type strain
- 4733.701, ATCC 16908, BCRC 33143, CBS 475.65, CCRC 33143, CGMCC 3.4372, FRR 0149, IMI 172281, JCM 1725, NRRLT, NRRL 149, NRRL WB149, QM 7405, Thom 4733.701, WB 149

Species of fungus

Aspergillus conicus is a xerophilic species of fungus in the genus Aspergillus which can cause endophthalmitis in rare cases. It was first described in 1914. It is from the section Restricti. Aspergillus conicus has been reported as a human pathogen.

When living inside olives, it can produce butylated hydroxytoluene.

== Growth and morphology ==
A. conicus has been cultivated on both Czapek yeast extract agar (CYA) plates and Malt Extract Agar Oxoid® (MEAOX) plates. The growth morphology of the colonies can be seen in the pictures below.

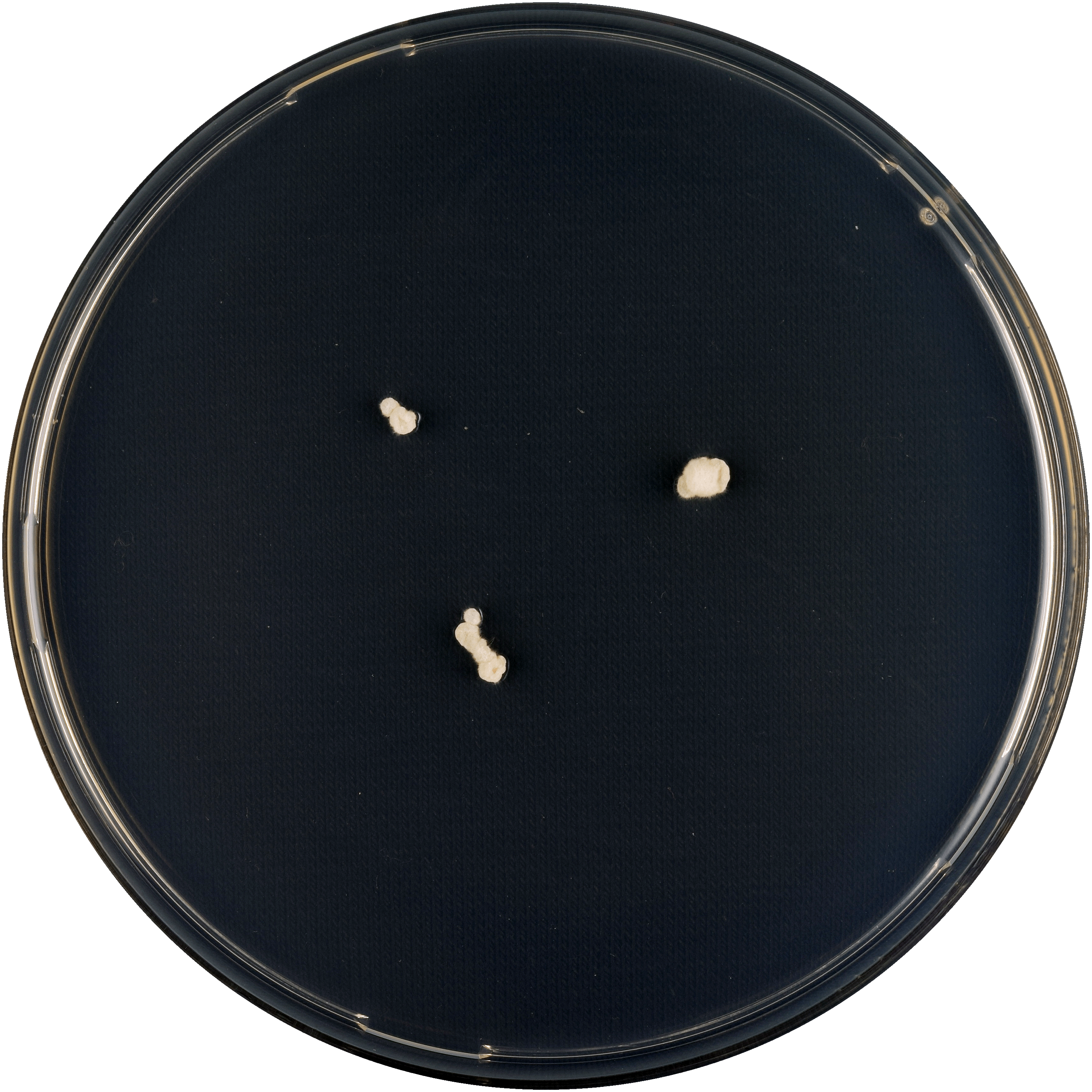
Aspergillus conicus growing on CYA plate

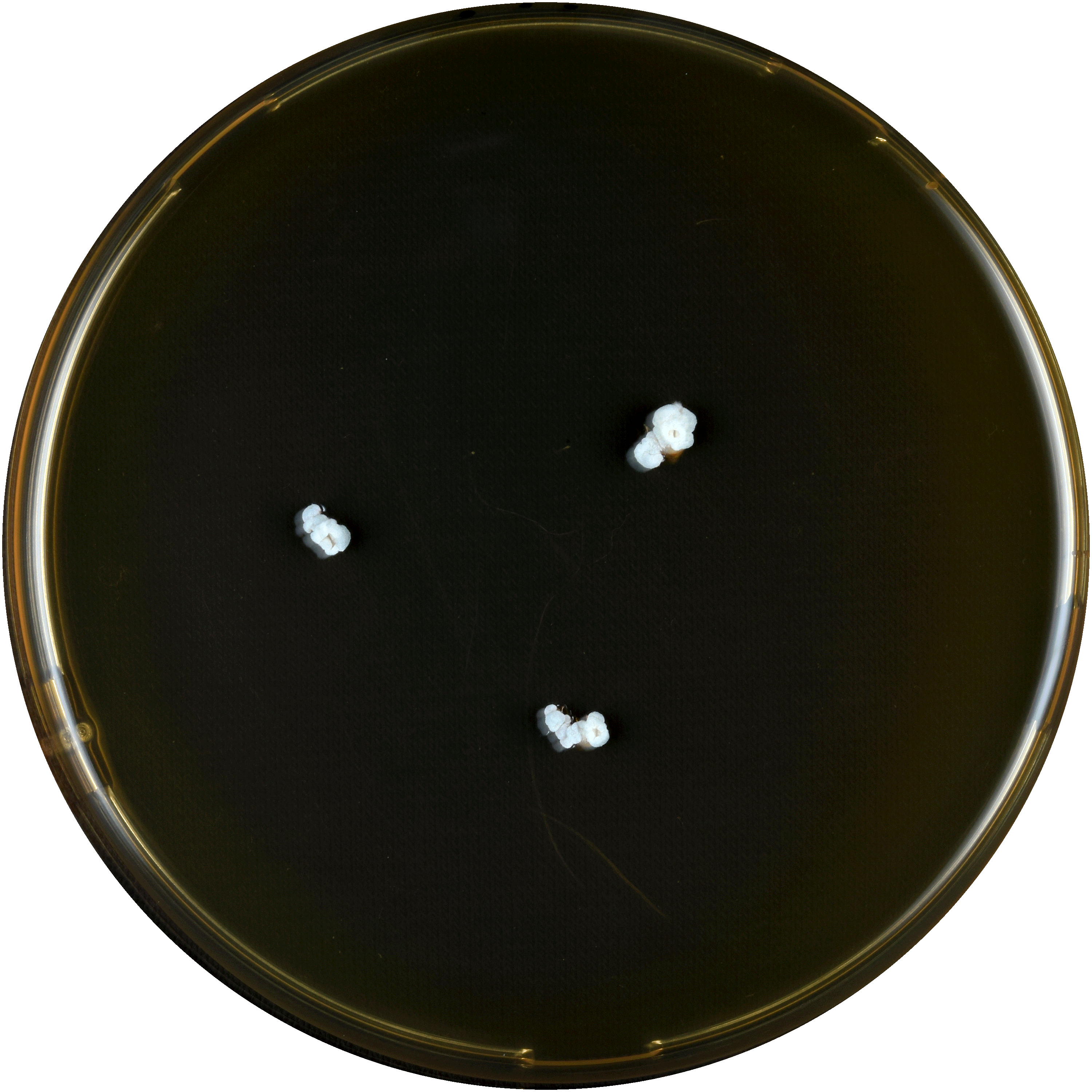
Aspergillus conicus growing on MEAOX plate
