= Butylated hydroxyanisole =

Names
- Preferred IUPAC name 2-tert-Butyl-4-methoxyphenol and 3-tert-butyl-4-methoxyphenol (mixture)
- Other names: 2-tert-Butyl-4-hydroxyanisole and 3-tert-butyl-4-hydroxyanisole (mixture); BOA; BHA; tert-Butyl-4-hydroxyanisole; (1,1-Dimethylethyl)-4-methoxyphenol; tert-Butyl-4-methoxyphenol; Antioxyne B

Identifiers
CAS Number	25013-16-5; 121-00-6 (2-tert); 88-32-4 (3-tert)
3D model (JSmol)	Interactive image
ChEBI	CHEBI:76359
ChEMBL	ChEMBL502074
ChemSpider	23068
ECHA InfoCard	100.042.315
E number	E320 (antioxidants, ...)
PubChem CID	8456
UNII	REK4960K2U; A03IJ8ROOP (2-tert); 62RAC24292 (3-tert)
CompTox Dashboard (EPA)	DTXSID7020215
- InChI: InChI=1S/2C11H16O2/c1-11(2,3)9-7-8(13-4)5-6-10(9)12;1-11(2,3)9-7-8(12)5-6-10(9)13-4/h2*5-7,12H,1-4H3 Key: CZBZUDVBLSSABA-UHFFFAOYSA-N; InChI=1/2C11H16O2/c1-11(2,3)9-7-8(13-4)5-6-10(9)12;1-11(2,3)9-7-8(12)5-6-10(9)13-4/h2*5-7,12H,1-4H3 Key: CZBZUDVBLSSABA-UHFFFAOYAZ
- SMILES: O(c1ccc(O)cc1C(C)(C)C)C.O(c1ccc(O)c(c1)C(C)(C)C)C

Properties
Chemical formula	C_{11}H_{16}O_{2}
Molar mass	180.247 g/mol
Appearance	Waxy solid
Density	1.0587 g/cm^{3} at 20 °C
Melting point	48 to 55 °C (118 to 131 °F; 321 to 328 K)
Boiling point	264 to 270 °C (507 to 518 °F; 537 to 543 K)
Solubility in water	Insoluble in water
Solubility	Freely soluble in ethanol, methanol, propylene glycol; soluble in fats and oils
Refractive index (n_{D})	1.5303 at 589.3 nm

Related compounds
Related compounds	Butylated hydroxytoluene
- Except where otherwise noted, data are given for materials in their standard state (at 25 °C [77 °F], 100 kPa). verify (what is ?) Infobox references

Butylated hydroxyanisole (BHA) is a synthetic, waxy, solid petrochemical. Its antioxidant properties have caused it to be widely used as a preservative in food, food packaging, animal feed, cosmetics, pharmaceuticals, rubber, and petroleum products. BHA has been used in food since around 1947.

== Chemistry ==
BHA consists of a mixture of two isomeric organic compounds, 2-tert-butyl-4-hydroxyanisole and 3-tert-butyl-4-hydroxyanisole. It is prepared from 4-methoxyphenol and isobutylene.

The conjugated aromatic ring of BHA is able to stabilize free radicals, sequestering them. By acting as free radical scavengers, further free radical reactions are prevented.

== Applications ==
Since 1947, BHA has been added to edible fats and fat-containing foods for its antioxidant properties as it prevents rancidification of food which creates objectionable odors. It has been assigned the E number E320. It is often combined with a similar chemical, butylated hydroxytoluene (BHT).

== Health effects ==
The U.S. National Institutes of Health report that BHA is reasonably anticipated to be a human carcinogen based on evidence of carcinogenicity in experimental animals. In particular, when administered in high doses as part of their diet, BHA causes papillomas and squamous cell carcinomas of the forestomach in rats and Syrian golden hamsters. In mice, there is no carcinogenic effect; in fact, there is evidence of a protective effect against the carcinogenicity of other chemicals.

When examining human population statistics, the usual low intake levels of BHA show no significant association with an increased risk of cancer.

The European Commission has conducted an evaluation of literature. They noted the lack of potential for the compound to induce carcinogenic effects in humans; studies showing carcinogenic effects in hamsters are not relevant to humans (which lack a forestomach). Also noted is that endocrine disruption, if any, is only likely to be present at levels vastly exceeding the intake as a food.

The International Agency for Research on Cancer (IARC) – Summaries & Evaluations stated butylated hydroxyanisole was tested for carcinogenicity in two experiments in rats and in two experiments in hamsters by administration in the diet, inducing benign and malignant tumours of the forestomach.

One of its metabolites is TBHQ (t-butylhydroquinone).

== See also ==
- Anisole
- Butylated hydroxytoluene (BHT)
