= Tris(2,4-di-tert-butylphenyl)phosphite =

Chemical compound

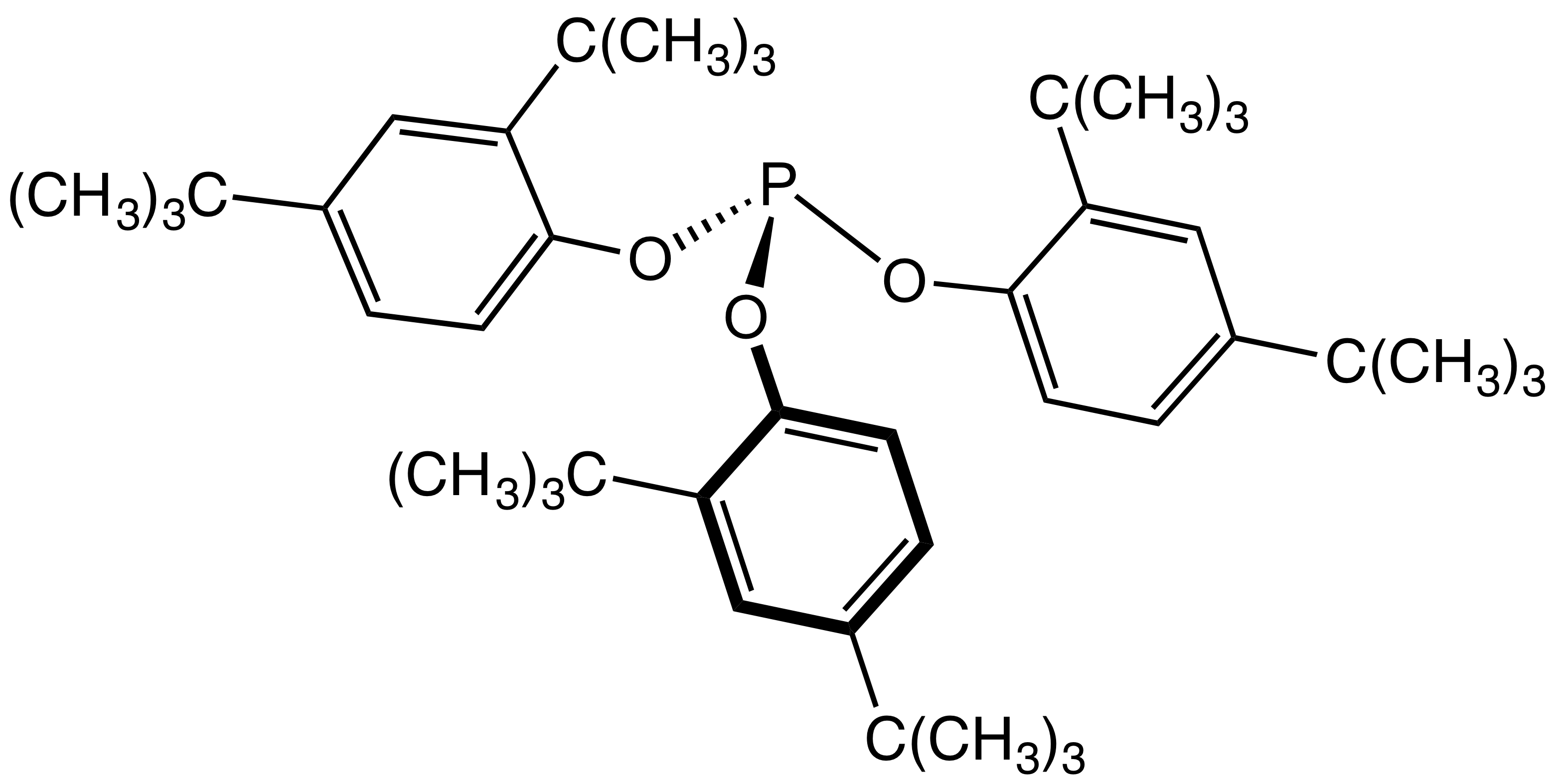

Names
- Preferred IUPAC name Tris(2,4-di-tert-butylphenyl)phosphite
- Other names: Plastic additive 12; Alkanox 240

Identifiers
CAS Number	31570-04-4
3D model (JSmol)	Interactive image
ChemSpider	82711
ECHA InfoCard	100.046.084
EC Number	250-709-6
PubChem CID	91601
UNII	834E5H0LFF
CompTox Dashboard (EPA)	DTXSID2027969
- InChI: InChI=1S/C42H63O3P/c1-37(2,3)28-19-22-34(31(25-28)40(10,11)12)43-46(44-35-23-20-29(38(4,5)6)26-32(35)41(13,14)15)45-36-24-21-30(39(7,8)9)27-33(36)42(16,17)18/h19-27H,1-18H3 Key: JKIJEFPNVSHHEI-UHFFFAOYSA-N
- SMILES: CC(C)(C)C1=CC(=C(C=C1)OP(OC2=C(C=C(C=C2)C(C)(C)C)C(C)(C)C)OC3=C(C=C(C=C3)C(C)(C)C)C(C)(C)C)C(C)(C)C

Properties
Chemical formula	C_{42}H_{63}O_{3}P
Molar mass	646.937 g·mol^{−1}
Appearance	white solid
Melting point	181–184 °C (358–363 °F; 454–457 K)
Solubility in water	<0.1 g/100g
Solubility in n-hexane	14 g/100g
Solubility in ethyl acetate	5 g/100g
Solubility in chloroform	58 g/100g
Solubility in toluene	40 g/100g
Solubility in methanol	<0.5 g/100g
- Except where otherwise noted, data are given for materials in their standard state (at 25 °C [77 °F], 100 kPa). Infobox references

Tris(2,4-di-tert-butylphenyl)phosphite is an organophosphorus compound with the formula [(C_{4}H_{9})_{2}C_{6}H_{3}O]_{3}P. This white solid is a widely used stabilizer in polymers where it functions as a secondary antioxidant. It also reduces discoloration (yellowing) of plastics. The compound is a phosphite ester formed by the reaction of 2,4-di-tert-butylphenol with phosphorus trichloride. It is an approved food contact materials in the US.

== See also ==
- Bis(2,4-di-tert-butylphenyl) pentaerythritol diphosphite - another phosphite antioxidant
- Pentaerythritol tetrakis(3,5-di-tert-butyl-4-hydroxyhydrocinnamate) - a common phenolic antioxidant that it often paired with.
