= Selenium and Vitamin E Cancer Prevention Trial =

Prostate cancer prevention trial

The Selenium and Vitamin E Cancer Prevention Trial, or SELECT, was a clinical trial conducted with the goal of determining whether vitamin E and selenium supplements could prevent prostate cancer. Enrollment for the trial began in 2001 and ended in 2004. It cost approximately $114 million to conduct and was performed at over 400 different research centers. It was primarily funded by the National Cancer Institute (NCI) and was carried out by SWOG. It was stopped early because the supplements did not show any benefit in preventing prostate cancer. Subsequent research based on the trial has generally found that selenium and vitamin E do not prevent prostate cancer. Other research based on foods rich in selenium or Vitamin E, not supplements, suggests that there is limited evidence such foods may protect against some forms of cancer.

== Methodology ==
The study followed over 35,000 men in the United States, Puerto Rico, and Canada, who were assigned randomly to receive either both a selenium and vitamin E supplement, selenium and placebo, vitamin E and placebo, or two placebos. It was one of the largest cancer prevention trials ever conducted, and was described by the NCI as "the largest-ever prostate cancer prevention study." Selenium and Vitamin E were chosen because they are well known antioxidants and had other mechanisms by which they were thought to prevent cancer, and preclinical and smaller clinical studies had yielded very promising results.

The study was originally planned to last for twelve years after enrollment began. However, it was stopped early in 2008 because no protective effect of supplementation on prostate cancer risk was found, and because the results suggested that vitamin E might increase the risk. About 17,000 participants from the original SELECT completed an additional four years of a Centralized Follow-Up from 2010 until May 31, 2014, when SELECT closed. The follow-up involved sending questionnaires to participants annually, which they could also fill out online.

== Results ==
Initial results were published in 2008 in JAMA. The initial results found that the increase in risk associated with Vitamin E was "statistically nonsignificant", which the researchers wanted to verify in a subsequent study.

A subsequent 2010 study further described SELECT's results and found that neither selenium nor vitamin E, on their own or in combination, prevented prostate cancer.

A 2011 study based on the trial found that the risk of prostate cancer was elevated by 17% in the group that took vitamin E supplements, which was statistically significant.

A 2014 study based on SELECT data found that selenium supplementation increased the risk of high-grade prostate cancer in men who had a higher baseline selenium status.

A 2014 Cochrane review found that SELECT raised concerns about a possible association between selenium supplements and an increase in risk of type 2 diabetes, alopecia and dermatitis. The review concluded that "no convincing evidence suggests that selenium supplements can prevent cancer in humans."
