= 2,4-Dimethyl-6-tert-butylphenol =

Names
- Preferred IUPAC name 2-tert-Butyl-4,6-dimethylphenol
- Other names 2,4-Dimethyl-6-tert-butylphenol; 6-tert-Butyl-2,4-dimethylphenol; 2-(tert-Butyl)-4,6-dimethylphenol; 2-tert-Butyl-4,6-dimethyl phenol 6-t-Butyl-2,4-xylenol; 2-(1,1-Dimethylethyl)-4,6-dimethyl-phenol

Identifiers
CAS Number	1879-09-0
3D model (JSmol)	Interactive image; Interactive image
ChEMBL	ChEMBL3561934
ChemSpider	15097
ECHA InfoCard	100.015.940
EC Number	217-533-1
PubChem CID	15884
UNII	4HZG7U1P1S
UN number	2430
CompTox Dashboard (EPA)	DTXSID6041551
- InChI: InChI=1S/C12H18O/c1-8-6-9(2)11(13)10(7-8)12(3,4)5/h6-7,13H,1-5H3 Key: OPLCSTZDXXUYDU-UHFFFAOYSA-N; InChI=1/C12H18O/c1-8-6-9(2)11(13)10(7-8)12(3,4)5/h6-7,13H,1-5H3 Key: OPLCSTZDXXUYDU-UHFFFAOYAT
- SMILES: CC(C)(C)c1c(O)c(C)cc(C)c1; Oc1c(cc(cc1C(C)(C)C)C)C

Properties
Chemical formula	C_{12}H_{18}O
Melting point	21 to 23 °C (70 to 73 °F; 294 to 296 K)
Boiling point	248 to 249 °C (478 to 480 °F; 521 to 522 K)

Hazards
- GHS labelling
Pictograms	(GHS06: Toxic) (GHS07: Exclamation mark) (GHS08: Health hazard) (GHS09: Environmental hazard)
Signal word	Danger
Hazard statements	H301, H302, H310, H315, H319, H373, H411
Precautionary statements	P260, P262, P264, P270, P273, P280, P301+P310, P301+P312, P302+P350, P302+P352, P305+P351+P338, P310, P314, P321, P322, P330, P332+P313, P337+P313, P361, P362, P363, P391, P405, P501
- Except where otherwise noted, data are given for materials in their standard state (at 25 °C [77 °F], 100 kPa). verify (what is ?) Infobox references

2,4-Dimethyl-6-tert-butylphenol is the organic compound with the formula Me_{2}(tert-Bu)C_{6}H_{2}OH (Me = methyl, tert-Bu = tertiary butyl). It is a colorless oil that is classified as an alkylated phenol.

== Preparation, reactions, uses ==
It is used as an antioxidant, e.g. to prevent gumming in fuels, and as an ultraviolet stabilizer. It is used in jet fuels, gasolines, and avgas.

It is prepared by alkylation of xylenol with isobutylene. This alkylation provides a means to separate 2,4-xylenol from 2,5-xylenol since 2,4-dimethyl-6-tert-butylphenol is insoluble in 10% NaOH but 2,5-dimethyl-6-tert-butylphenol is soluble. Subsequent to separation, the tert-butyl group can be removed in strong acid.

== Tradenames ==
One of its trade names is Topanol A. It is found in antioxidant mixtures AO-30, AO-31, AO-32, IONOL K72, IONOL K78, IONOL K98, and others.

== See also ==
- 2,6-Di-tert-butylphenol
- Butylated hydroxytoluene
- Propofol (Structural isomer)
- List of gasoline additives
