= 1,3,5-Tris(4-(tert-butyl)-3-hydroxy-2,6-dimethylbenzyl)-1,3,5-triazinane-2,4,6-trione =

Names
- Preferred IUPAC name Tris[(4-tert-butyl-3-hydroxy-2,6-dimethylphenyl)methyl]-1,3,5-triazinanetrione
- Other names Chemical names: Tris(4-tert-butyl-3-hydroxy-2,6-dimethylbenzyl) isocyanurate; 1,3,5-tris[(4-tert-butyl-3-hydroxy-2,6-xylyl)methyl]-1,3,5-triazine-2,4,6(1H,3H,5H)-trione; 1,3,5-tris-[(3,5-di-tert-butyl-4-hydroxyphenyl)methyl]-1,3,5-triazinane-2,4,6-trione; Trade names: Cyanox 1790 (Syensqo); Irganox 3790 (BASF); Lowinox 1790 (SI Group); Songnox 1790 (Songwon)

Identifiers
CAS Number	40601-76-1
3D model (JSmol)	Interactive image
ChEMBL	ChEMBL3184256
ChemSpider	84161
ECHA InfoCard	100.049.980
EC Number	254-996-9
PubChem CID	93221
UNII	253H13NWCQ
CompTox Dashboard (EPA)	DTXSID8028008
- InChI: InChI=1S/C42H57N3O6/c1-22-16-31(40(7,8)9)34(46)25(4)28(22)19-43-37(49)44(20-29-23(2)17-32(41(10,11)12)35(47)26(29)5)39(51)45(38(43)50)21-30-24(3)18-33(42(13,14)15)36(48)27(30)6/h16-18,46-48H,19-21H2,1-15H3 Key: InChIKey=XYXJKPCGSGVSBO-UHFFFAOYSA-N
- SMILES: C(N1C(=O)N(CC2=C(C)C(O)=C(C(C)(C)C)C=C2C)C(=O)N(CC3=C(C)C(O)=C(C(C)(C)C)C=C3C)C1=O)C4=C(C)C(O)=C(C(C)(C)C)C=C4C

Properties
Chemical formula	C_{42}H_{57}N_{3}O_{6}
Molar mass	699.933 g·mol^{−1}
Appearance	White solid
Density	1.15
Melting point	158 to 162 °C (316 to 324 °F; 431 to 435 K)
Boiling point	370 °C (698 °F; 643 K)
Solubility in water	0.02 mg/L
- Except where otherwise noted, data are given for materials in their standard state (at 25 °C [77 °F], 100 kPa). Infobox references

1,3,5-Tris(4-(tert-butyl)-3-hydroxy-2,6-dimethylbenzyl)-1,3,5-triazinane-2,4,6-trione (abbreviated here as Antioxidant 1790) is a speciality antioxidant used to stabilise plastics and synthetic fibres.

== Synthesis ==
It can be synthesised in a 2-step manner. Firstly, 2,4-dimethyl-6-tert-butylphenol is reacted with formaldehyde and HCl (Blanc reaction) to generate a chloromethyl group in the less hindered meta position. This intermediate then reacts with cyanuric acid to give the desired product.

== Properties ==
As each phenol group contains only a single t-butyl group they are considered to have low steric hindrance and thus high activity. Arranging three of these around an isocyanurate core gives a compound with a sufficiently high boiling point that it is not volatilised out of the plastic during plastic extrusion and moulding (up to 320 °C in the case of PA). The isocyanurate core also promotes a high level of crystallinity, which greatly reduces extraction of the antioxidant into water.

== Applications ==
Although it is compatible with polyolefins Antioxidant 1790 is a fairly expensive antioxidant and it is primarily used in speciality applications. It has good compatibility with the engineering plastics, high activity and low colour formation, which makes it common choice in synthetic fibres (polyurethane, polyester and polyamide), particularly elastane.

== See also ==
- Tris(3,5-di-tert-butyl-4-hydroxybenzyl) isocyanurate - related phenolic antioxidant with a cyanurate core
