= Pentaerythritol tetrakis(3,5-di-tert-butyl-4-hydroxyhydrocinnamate) =

Pentaerythritol tetrakis(3,5-di-tert-butyl-4-hydroxyhydrocinnamate

Names
- Preferred IUPAC name 2,2-Bis({[3-(3,5-di-tert-butyl-4-hydroxyphenyl)propanoyl]oxy}methyl)propane-1,3-diyl bis[3-(3,5-di-tert-butyl-4-hydroxyphenyl)propanoate]
- Other names Anox 20, Irganox 1010, Dovernox 10

Identifiers
CAS Number	6683-19-8
3D model (JSmol)	Interactive image
ChEMBL	ChEMBL3187856
ChemSpider	58351
ECHA InfoCard	100.214.246
EC Number	229-722-6
PubChem CID	64819
RTECS number	DA8340900
UNII	255PIF62MS
CompTox Dashboard (EPA)	DTXSID1027633
- InChI: InChI=1S/C73H108O12/c1-65(2,3)49-33-45(34-50(61(49)78)66(4,5)6)25-29-57(74)82-41-73(42-83-58(75)30-26-46-35-51(67(7,8)9)62(79)52(36-46)68(10,11)12,43-84-59(76)31-27-47-37-53(69(13,14)15)63(80)54(38-47)70(16,17)18)44-85-60(77)32-28-48-39-55(71(19,20)21)64(81)56(40-48)72(22,23)24/h33-40,78-81H,25-32,41-44H2,1-24H3 Key: BGYHLZZASRKEJE-UHFFFAOYSA-N
- SMILES: CC(C)(C)C1=CC(=CC(=C1O)C(C)(C)C)CCC(=O)OCC(COC(=O)CCC2=CC(=C(C(=C2)C(C)(C)C)O)C(C)(C)C)(COC(=O)CCC3=CC(=C(C(=C3)C(C)(C)C)O)C(C)(C)C)COC(=O)CCC4=CC(=C(C(=C4)C(C)(C)C)O)C(C)(C)C

Properties
Chemical formula	C_{73}H_{108}O_{12}
Molar mass	1177.655 g·mol^{−1}
Appearance	White solid
Melting point	110–125 °C (230–257 °F; 383–398 K)
Solubility in water	<0.1 g/ml
Solubility in Acetone	0.75 g/ml
Solubility in Toluene	0.5 g/ml
Solubility in Methanol	<0.1 g/ml

Hazards
- GHS labelling
Hazard statements	H413
Precautionary statements	P273, P501
- Except where otherwise noted, data are given for materials in their standard state (at 25 °C [77 °F], 100 kPa). Infobox references

Pentaerythritol tetrakis(3,5-di-tert-butyl-4-hydroxyhydrocinnamate) is a chemical compound composed of four sterically hindered phenols linked through a pentaerythritol core. It is used as primary antioxidant for stabilizing polymers, particularly polyethylene and polypropylene.

== Synthesis ==
Base catalysed Michael addition of methyl acrylate to 2,6-di-tert-butylphenol forms the intermediate dibutyl-phloretic ester. High temperature transesterification of this with pentaerythritol gives the final product. Driving this reaction to completion can be difficult and commercial samples often contain low levels of the tri-ester.

== Properties ==
The linking of phenols together with pentaerythritol maintains their activity with greatly reduced volatility. This is important during the processing and molding steps where the plastic is heated to molten, typically several hundred degrees.

== See also ==
- Octadecyl 3-(3,5-di-tert-butyl-4-hydroxyphenyl)propionate - an inexpensive and commonly used polymer stabiliser
- Tris(3,5-di-tert-butyl-4-hydroxybenzyl) isocyanurate - a polymer stabiliser commonly used to protect against long term heat aging
- Irganox 1098 - a polymer stabiliser with metal chelation properties
