= Phloretin hydrolase =

Class of enzymes

phloretin hydrolase

Identifiers
- EC no.: 3.7.1.4
- CAS no.: 37289-38-6

Databases
- BRENDA: enzyme data
- ExPASy: NiceZyme view
- KEGG: enzyme entry
- MetaCyc: metabolic pathway
- Rhea: reactions
- PDB structures: RCSB PDB PDBe PDBsum
- Gene Ontology: AmiGO / QuickGO
Search
- PMC: articles
- PubMed: articles
- NCBI: proteins

Phloretin hydrolase (EC 3.7.1.4) is an enzyme characterised from Aspergillus niger and Erwinia herbicola that catalyzes the hydrolysis of phloretin to phloretic acid and phloroglucinol:

phloretin
H_{2}O
phloretic acid
+
phloroglucinol

The reaction is part of a pathway for the breakdown of flavanoids such as apigenin and naringenin. Bacteria present in the human gut can metabolise dietary components in this way.

This enzyme is a hydrolase, specifically one acting on carbon–carbon bonds in ketonic substances. The systematic name of this enzyme class is 2',4,4',6'-tetrahydroxydehydrochalcone 1,3,5-trihydroxybenzenehydrolase. It is also called lactase-phlorizin hydrolase.
