= IP-LAD =

Chemical compound

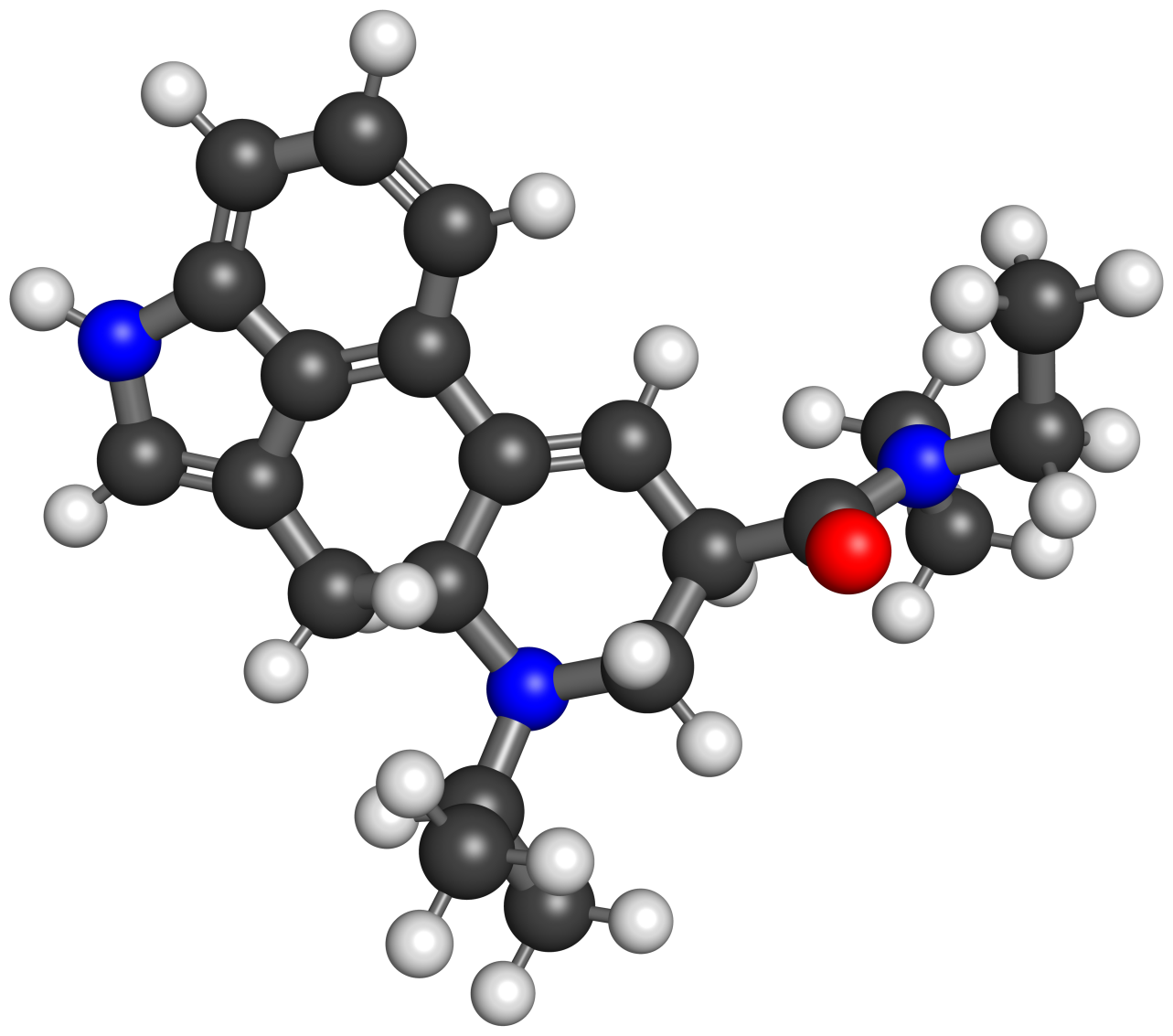

Clinical data
- Other names: IPRLAD; IP-LAD; IPLAD; 6-Isopropyl-6-nor-LSD; 6-Isopropyl-6-nor-lysergic acid diethylamide
- Routes of administration: Oral
- Drug class: Serotonin receptor modulator; Serotonergic psychedelic; Hallucinogen

Legal status
- Legal status: DE: NpSG (Industrial and scientific use only); UK: Class A

Identifiers
- IUPAC name: (6aR,9R)-N,N-Diethyl-7-propan-2-yl-6,6a,8,9-tetrahydro-4H-indolo[4,3-fg]quinoline-9-carboxamide
- CAS Number: 96930-86-8
- PubChem CID: 44458092
- ChemSpider: 23120596
- ChEMBL: ChEMBL22893

Chemical and physical data
- Formula: C_{22}H_{29}N_{3}O
- Molar mass: 351.494 g·mol^{−1}
- 3D model (JSmol): Interactive image
- SMILES: CCN(CC)C(=O)[C@H]1CN([C@@H]2CC3=CNC4=CC=CC(=C34)C2=C1)C(C)C
- InChI: InChI=1S/C22H29N3O/c1-5-24(6-2)22(26)16-10-18-17-8-7-9-19-21(17)15(12-23-19)11-20(18)25(13-16)14(3)4/h7-10,12,14,16,20,23H,5-6,11,13H2,1-4H3/t16-,20-/m1/s1; Key:GLNOSFGSNDKLOC-OXQOHEQNSA-N

IP-LAD, or IPLAD, also known as IPR-LAD or as 6-isopropyl-6-nor-LSD, is an analogue of lysergic acid diethylamide (LSD) developed by the team of David E. Nichols. In studies on mice, it was found to be approximately 40% the potency of LSD, compared to the 60% increase in potency seen with ETH-LAD, 2-fold potency increase of AL-LAD, and roughly equivalent potency of PRO-LAD. It is not a controlled substance in Canada as of 2025.

== See also ==
- Substituted lysergamide
- MAL-LAD
