= Lead stearate =

Names
- Other names: Lead(2+) octadecanoate; lead(II) stearate; lead distearate

Identifiers
| CAS Number | 1072-35-1 |
| 3D model (JSmol) | Interactive image |
| ChemSpider | 55198 |
| ECHA InfoCard | 100.012.733 |
| EC Number | 214-005-2 |
| PubChem CID | 61258 |
| UNII | HQ5TZ3NAEI |
| UN number | UN 2291 |
| CompTox Dashboard (EPA) | 0029630 |
- InChI: InChI=1S/2C18H36O2.Pb/c2*1-2-3-4-5-6-7-8-9-10-11-12-13-14-15-16-17-18(19)20;/h2*2-17H2,1H3,(H,19,20);/q;;+2/p-2 Key: UQLDLKMNUJERMK-UHFFFAOYSA-L
- SMILES: CCCCCCCCCCCCCCCCCC(=O)[O-].CCCCCCCCCCCCCCCCCC(=O)[O-].[Pb+2]

Properties
| Chemical formula | Pb(C_{18}H_{35}O_{2})_{2} |
| Molar mass | 774.2 g·mol^{−1} |
| Appearance | White powder |
| Density | 1.4 g/cm^{3} |
| Melting point | 100 °C (212 °F; 373 K) |
| Solubility in water | Insoluble |
| Solubility | Soluble in hot ethanol. |

Hazards
- GHS labelling
| Pictograms | (GHS07: Exclamation mark) (GHS08: Health hazard) (GHS09: Environmental hazard) |
| Signal word | Danger |
| Hazard statements | H302+H332, H360, H373, H410 |
| Precautionary statements | P270, P273, P280, P301+P312, P304+P340, P308+P313 |
- Except where otherwise noted, data are given for materials in their standard state (at 25 °C [77 °F], 100 kPa). Infobox references

Lead stearate is a metal-organic compound, a salt of lead and stearic acid with the chemical formula Pb(C_{18}H_{35}O_{2})_{2}. The compound is classified as a metallic soap, i.e. a metal derivative of a fatty acid. The compound is toxic.

== Synthesis ==
The compound can be prepared by reacting stearic acid, lead(II) oxide, and a catalyst acetic acid.

2 C_{17}H_{35}COOH + PbO → Pb(C_{18}H_{35}O_{2})_{2} + H_{2}O

It may also be prepared via an exchange reaction between lead(II) acetate and sodium stearate:

Pb(C_{2}H_{3}O_{2})_{2} + 2 NaC_{18}H_{35}O_{2} → Pb(C_{18}H_{35}O_{2})_{2}↓ + 2 NaC_{2}H_{3}O_{2}

== Uses ==
The compound is used as a drier in oil paints and varnishes to speed the polymerization and oxidation processes. Also used as a lubricant and stabilizer in vinyl polymers and as a corrosion inhibitor in petroleum products.
