= Aspergillus cvjetkovicii =

Scientific classification
- Kingdom: Fungi
- Division: Ascomycota
- Class: Eurotiomycetes
- Order: Eurotiales
- Family: Aspergillaceae
- Genus: Aspergillus
- Species: A. cvjetkovicii

Binomial name
- Aspergillus cvjetkovicii Jurjevic, Peterson & Horn, 2012

Species of fungus

Aspergillus cvjetkovicii is a species of fungus in the genus Aspergillus.
