= Irganox 1098 =

Names
- Preferred IUPAC name N,N′-(Hexane-1,6-diyl)bis[3-(3,5-di-tert-butyl-4-hydroxyphenyl)propanamide]
- Other names N,N′-Hexamethylenebis(3,5-di-tert-butyl-4-hydroxyhydrocinnamamide); 1,6-Bis(3,5-di-tert-butyl-4-hydroxyhydrocinnamido)hexane

Identifiers
CAS Number	23128-74-7
3D model (JSmol)	Interactive image
ChemSpider	81250
ECHA InfoCard	100.041.296
EC Number	245-442-7
PubChem CID	90004
UNII	918T54D300
CompTox Dashboard (EPA)	DTXSID5044233
- InChI: InChI=1S/C40H64N2O4/c1-37(2,3)29-23-27(24-30(35(29)45)38(4,5)6)17-19-33(43)41-21-15-13-14-16-22-42-34(44)20-18-28-25-31(39(7,8)9)36(46)32(26-28)40(10,11)12/h23-26,45-46H,13-22H2,1-12H3,(H,41,43)(H,42,44) Key: OKOBUGCCXMIKDM-UHFFFAOYSA-N; InChI=1/C40H64N2O4/c1-37(2,3)29-23-27(24-30(35(29)45)38(4,5)6)17-19-33(43)41-21-15-13-14-16-22-42-34(44)20-18-28-25-31(39(7,8)9)36(46)32(26-28)40(10,11)12/h23-26,45-46H,13-22H2,1-12H3,(H,41,43)(H,42,44) Key: OKOBUGCCXMIKDM-UHFFFAOYAW
- SMILES: CC(c1c(c(cc(c1)CC/C(=N/CCCCCC/N=C(\O)/CCc2cc(c(c(c2)C(C)(C)C)O)C(C)(C)C)/O)C(C)(C)C)O)(C)C

Properties
Chemical formula	C_{40}H_{64}N_{2}O_{4}
Molar mass	636.962 g·mol^{−1}
Density	1.021 g/cm^{3}
Melting point	158–159 °C (316–318 °F; 431–432 K) (benzene:cyclohexane 2:3)
- Except where otherwise noted, data are given for materials in their standard state (at 25 °C [77 °F], 100 kPa). Infobox references

Irganox 1098 is the trade name for N,N′-(hexane-1,6-diyl)bis[3-(3,5-di-tert-butyl-4-hydroxyphenyl)propanamide], a primary antioxidant manufactured by BASF primarily used for stabilizing polymers, especially polyamides. It is noted for its thermal stability as well as its non-discoloring properties.

== See also ==
- Pentaerythritol tetrakis(3,5-di-tert-butyl-4-hydroxyhydrocinnamate)
