= 2-(2-Hydroxyphenyl)-2H-benzotriazoles =

Class of chemical compounds

General structural formula of 2-(2-hydroxyphenyl)-2H-benzotriazoles

2-(2-Hydroxyphenyl)-2H-benzotriazoles, also referred to as phenolic benzotriazoles, are an important class of UV absorbers comprising the benzotriazole building block.

== Structure ==
The molecules are composed of substituted benzotriazoles with a phenyl group in the 2-position, which carries a hydroxy group in the ortho-position.

Examples of 2-(2-hydroxyphenyl)-2H-benzotriazoles
Name	Acronym	Structural formula	R^{1}	R^{2}	R^{3}
2-(2H-Benzotriazol-2-yl)-4-methylphenol	UV-P	Chemical structure of UV-P	–	methyl	–
2-(2H-Benzotriazol-2-yl)-4-tert-butylphenol	UV-PS	Chemical structure of UV-PS	–	tert-butyl	–
2-(2H-Benzotriazol-2-yl)-4,6-bis(2-phenyl-2-propanyl)phenol	UV-234	Chemical structure of UV-234	(2-propanyl)phenol	(2-propanyl)phenol	–
2-(2H-Benzotriazol-2-yl)-4,6-di-tert-butylphenol	UV-320	Chemical structure of UV-320	tert-butyl	tert-butyl	–
2-(5-Chloro-2H-benzotriazol-2-yl)-4-methyl-6-di-tert-butylphenol	UV-326	Chemical structure of UV-326	tert-butyl	methyl	chlorine
2-(5-Chloro-2H-benzotriazol-2-yl)-4,6-di-tert-butylphenol	UV-327	Chemical structure of UV-327	tert-butyl	tert-butyl	chlorine
2-(2H-Benzotriazol-2-yl)-4,6-di-tert-pentylphenol	UV-328	Chemical structure of UV-328	tert-pentyl	tert-pentyl	–
2-(2H-Benzotriazol-2-yl)-4-(1,1,3,3-tetramethylbutyl)phenol	UV-329	Chemical structure of UV-329	–	1,1,3,3-tetramethylbutyl	–
2-(2H-Benzotriazol-2-yl)-6-(sec-butyl)-4-(tert-butyl)phenol	UV-350	Chemical structure of UV-350	sec-butyl	tert-butyl	–
2,2′-Methylenbis[6-(2H-benzotriazol-2-yl)-4-(2,4,4-trimethyl-2-pentanyl)phenol]	UV-360	Chemical structure of UV-360	[dimer linked via methylene group]	1,1,3,3-tetramethylbutyl	–
2-(2H-Benzotriazol-2-yl)-6-(2-phenyl-2-propanyl)-4-(2,4,4-trimethyl-2-pentanyl)phenol	UV-928	Chemical structure of UV-928	(2-propanyl)phenol	1,1,3,3-tetramethylbutyl	–

== Use ==
2-(2-hydroxyphenyl)-2H-benzotriazoles are used as UV stabilizers in lacquers and plastics.
