= 2,6-Di-tert-butylphenol =

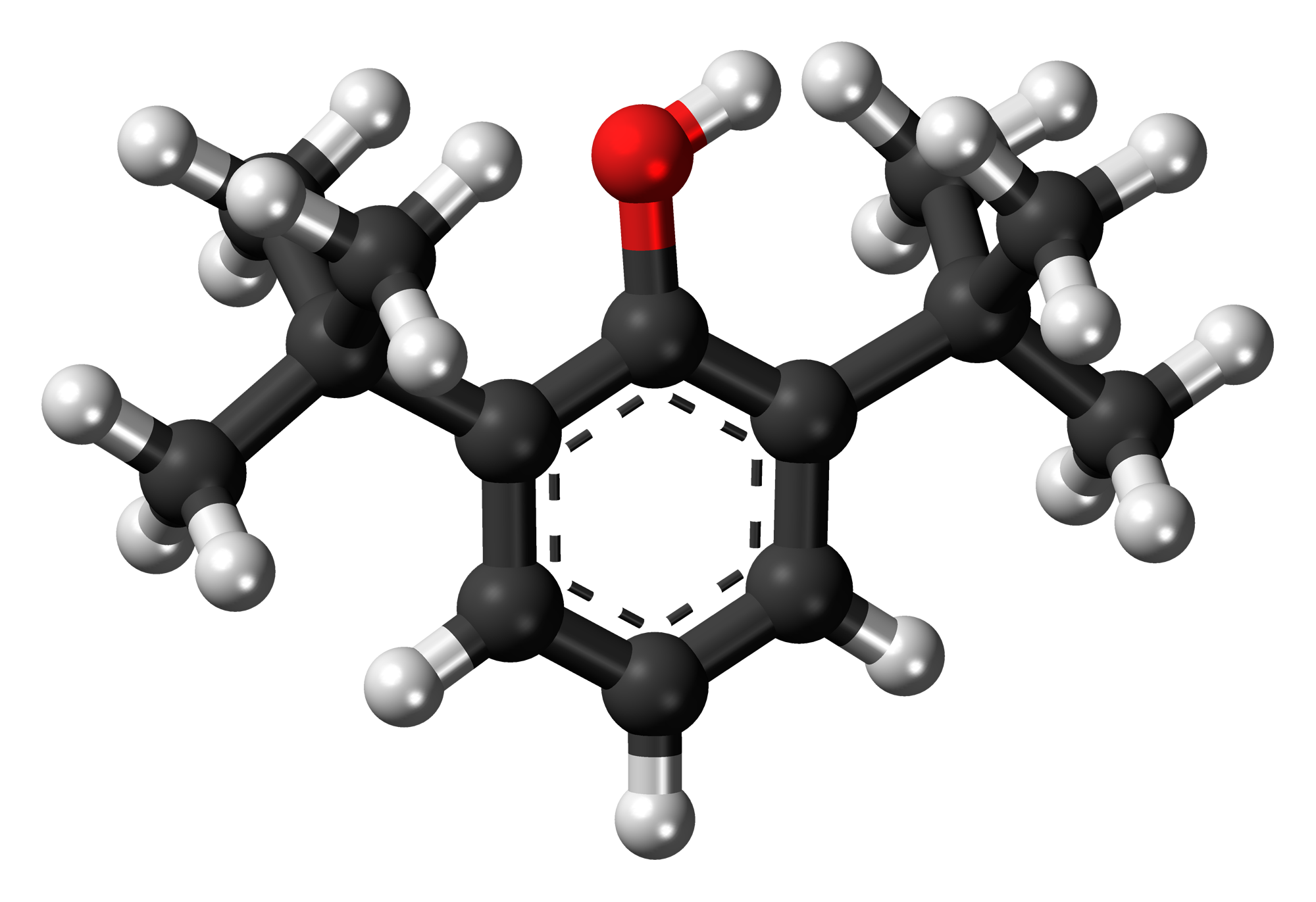

Names
- Preferred IUPAC name 2,6-Di-tert-butylphenol
- Other names 2,6-Bis(1,1-dimethylethyl)phenol; Dibutylphenol; 2,6-Bis(tert-butyl)phenol; 2,6-Di(1,1-dimethylethyl)phenol; 2,6-DTBP; Ethanox 701; Ethyl 701; Ethyl AN 701; Irganox L 140; Isonox 103; TK 12891

Identifiers
CAS Number	128-39-2
3D model (JSmol)	Interactive image
ChEBI	CHEBI:131421
ChEMBL	ChEMBL281071
ChemSpider	29135
ECHA InfoCard	100.004.441
EC Number	204-884-0
PubChem CID	31405
RTECS number	SK8265000
UNII	21294V58PF
UN number	2430, 3077
CompTox Dashboard (EPA)	DTXSID6027052
- InChI: InChI=1S/C14H22O/c1-13(2,3)10-8-7-9-11(12(10)15)14(4,5)6/h7-9,15H,1-6H3 Key: DKCPKDPYUFEZCP-UHFFFAOYSA-N; InChI=1/C14H22O/c1-13(2,3)10-8-7-9-11(12(10)15)14(4,5)6/h7-9,15H,1-6H3 Key: DKCPKDPYUFEZCP-UHFFFAOYAK
- SMILES: Oc1c(cccc1C(C)(C)C)C(C)(C)C

Properties
Chemical formula	C_{14}H_{22}O
Molar mass	206.329 g·mol^{−1}
Appearance	Low-melting colourless solid
Melting point	34 to 37 °C (93 to 99 °F; 307 to 310 K)
Boiling point	253 °C (487 °F; 526 K)

Hazards
- GHS labelling
Pictograms	(GHS07: Exclamation mark) (GHS09: Environmental hazard)
Signal word	Warning
Hazard statements	H315, H319, H410
Precautionary statements	P264, P273, P280, P302+P352, P305+P351+P338, P321, P332+P313, P337+P313, P362, P391, P501
Flash point	118 °C (244 °F; 391 K)
- Except where otherwise noted, data are given for materials in their standard state (at 25 °C [77 °F], 100 kPa). verify (what is ?) Infobox references

2,6-Di-tert-butylphenol is an organic compound with the structural formula 2,6-((CH_{3})_{3}C)_{2}C_{6}H_{3}OH. This colorless solid alkylated phenol and its derivatives are used industrially as UV stabilizers and antioxidants for hydrocarbon-based products ranging from petrochemicals to plastics. Illustrative of its usefulness, it prevents gumming in aviation fuels.

== Production ==
2,6-Di-tert-butylphenol is prepared industrially via the Friedel–Crafts alkylation of phenol with isobutene catalyzed by aluminium phenoxide:

C_{6}H_{5}OH + 2 CH_{2}=C(CH_{3})_{2} → ((CH_{3})_{3}C)_{2}C_{6}H_{3}OH

In this way, approximately 2.5M kg/y are produced. Alkylation of phenol usually favours the para-position, and a strong lewis acid such as the Al^{3+} ion is necessary to give selective ortho‑alkylation. If a conventional brønsted acid is used then 2,4-di-tert-butylphenol will be produced instead.

=== Natural occurrence ===
Two species of plants, Jastropa curcas and Metaplexis japonica, contain 2,6-DTBP in seeds.

== Applications ==
Its dominant use is as an antioxidant.

2,6-Di-tert-butylphenol is used in the synthesis of 4,4′-biphenol. The process involves oxidative coupling of followed by removal of the tert-butyl groups.

2,6-di-tert-butylphenol is a precursor to antioxidants and light-protection agents for the stabilization for polymers. One such case is methyl-3-(3,5-di-tert-butyl-4-hydroxyphenyl)-propionate (CAS# 6386-38-5), which is formed by the Michael addition of methyl acrylate. This compound is used in the synthesis of more complex antioxidants such as Irganox 1098. 2,6-Di-tert-butylphenol is also used in the synthesis of CGP-7930, probucol, and nicanartine.

== Safety and regulation ==
The LD_{50} is 9200 mg/kg, indicating a low toxicity.

2,6-Di-tert-butylphenol is covered by the U.S. Department of Transportation Code of Federal Regulations 49 CFR 172.101, Appendix B (20 Dec 2004). This substance is designated by the U.S. Department of Transportation (DOT) as a marine pollutant.

== See also ==
- Butylated hydroxytoluene
- 2,4-di-tert-butylphenol
- 2,4-Dimethyl-6-tert-butylphenol
- Para tertiary butyl phenol
