= UV-328 =

Names
- Preferred IUPAC name 2-(2H-1,2,3-Benzotriazol-2-yl)-4,6-bis(2-methylbutan-2-yl)phenol
- Other names 2-(2H-Benzotriazol-2-yl)-4,6-di-tert-pentylphenol; Tinuvin-328; UV-328

Identifiers
CAS Number	25973-55-1
3D model (JSmol)	Interactive image
ChemSpider	30728
ECHA InfoCard	100.043.062
EC Number	247-384-8
PubChem CID	33263
UNII	VN99CPK4TI
CompTox Dashboard (EPA)	DTXSID2027886
- InChI: InChI=1S/C22H29N3O/c1-7-21(3,4)15-13-16(22(5,6)8-2)20(26)19(14-15)25-23-17-11-9-10-12-18(17)24-25/h9-14,26H,7-8H2,1-6H3 Key: ZMWRRFHBXARRRT-UHFFFAOYSA-N
- SMILES: CCC(C)(C)C1=CC(=C(C(=C1)N2N=C3C=CC=CC3=N2)O)C(C)(C)CC

Properties
Chemical formula	C_{22}H_{29}N_{3}O
Molar mass	351.494 g·mol^{−1}
Appearance	Solid
Melting point	80-86 °C
Solubility in water	0,17±0,07 μg·l^{−1} (25 °C)

Hazards
- GHS labelling
Pictograms	(GHS07: Exclamation mark)
Signal word	Warning
Hazard statements	H373, H413
Precautionary statements	P260, P273, P314, P501
- Except where otherwise noted, data are given for materials in their standard state (at 25 °C [77 °F], 100 kPa). Infobox references

UV-328 (2-(2H-benzotriazol-2-yl)-4,6-di-tert-pentylphenol) is a chemical compound that belongs to the phenolic benzotriazoles. It is a UV filter that is used as an UV-absorber for plastics.

== Properties ==
UV-328 has a melting point of 80-86 °C, a vapor pressure of 4.6·10^{−5} Pa (20 °C) and a water solubility of 0.17±0.07 μg·l^{−1} (25 °C).

The octanol-water partition coefficient (log K_{OW}) is 7.93.

== Applications ==
UV-328 is a light stabilizer for a variety of plastics and other organic substrates. It has been used for the stabilization of styrene homopolymers and copolymers, acrylic polymers, unsaturated polyesters, polyvinyl chloride, polyolefins, polyurethanes, polyacetals, polyvinyl butyral, elastomers and adhesives. It protects polymers and organic pigments from UV radiation and helps maintain the original appearance and physical integrity of moldings, films, sheets and fibers during outdoor weathering. The application concentration is 0.1-1 %.

UV-328 has been used for applications such as automotive coatings, industrial coatings, commercial inks such as wood stains or do-it-yourself inks.

== Hazard ==
UV-328 is persistent, bioaccumulative and toxic (PBT) as well as very persistent and very bioaccumulative (vPvB). Thus, it is in the list of substances of very high concern. The 2023 Conference of the Parties of the United Nations Stockholm Convention on Persistent Organic Pollutants took the decision to eliminate the use of UV-328, by listing this chemical in Annex A to the Convention.

A bioaccumulation factor (log BAF) of 2.6–3.4 was determined in fish from Canadian rivers. It may cause long lasting harmful effects to aquatic life.

UV-328 has been found to be associated with adverse health effects in mammals based on repeated-dose toxicity studies conducted in rats and dogs, with the primary health effect being liver toxicity. It is also associated with adverse effects on the kidney based on the study in rats.

The finding of UV-328 in plastics sampled on remote beaches, in stomachs of seabirds and in preen gland oil show that it is also transported over long distances and is taken up by biota. Detections in Arctic biota include eggs of common eider, kittiwake, European shag and glaucous gull as well as the livers of mink.

== See also ==
- Tinuvin 770
