= Phloretic acid =

Names
- Preferred IUPAC name 3-(4-Hydroxyphenyl)propanoic acid
- Other names Desaminotyrosine; Hydro-p-coumaric acid Phloretate

Identifiers
CAS Number	501-97-3
3D model (JSmol)	Interactive image
ChEBI	CHEBI:32980
ChemSpider	9965
ECHA InfoCard	100.007.211
EC Number	207-931-3
KEGG	C01744
MeSH	C008869
PubChem CID	10394
UNII	6QNC6P18SR
CompTox Dashboard (EPA)	DTXSID2075427
- InChI: InChI=1S/C9H10O3/c10-8-4-1-7(2-5-8)3-6-9(11)12/h1-2,4-5,10H,3,6H2,(H,11,12) Key: NMHMNPHRMNGLLB-UHFFFAOYSA-N
- SMILES: C1=CC(=CC=C1CCC(=O)O)O

Properties
Chemical formula	C_{9}H_{10}O_{3}
Molar mass	166.176 g·mol^{−1}
Melting point	129 °C (264 °F; 402 K)
- Except where otherwise noted, data are given for materials in their standard state (at 25 °C [77 °F], 100 kPa). Infobox references

Phloretic acid is an organic compound with the formula HOC_{6}H_{4}(CH_{2})_{2}CO_{2}H. It is a white solid. The compound contains both phenol and carboxylic acid functional groups. It is sometimes called Desaminotyrosine (DAT) because it is identical to the common alpha amino acid tyrosine except for the absence of the amino functional group on the alpha carbon.

== Production and occurrence ==
Phloretic acid is produced by reduction of the unsaturated side chain of p-coumaric acid. Together with phloroglucinol, it is produced by the action of the enzyme phloretin hydrolase on phloretin.

It is found in olives. It is found in the rumen of sheep fed with dried grass. It is also a urinary metabolite of tyrosine in rats.

Polyesters have been prepared from phloretic acid.

It is one of the products of flavonoid metabolism performed by the bacterium Clostridium orbiscindens, a resident of some human intestinal tracts.

== Drug uses ==
Phloretic acid is used in the synthesis of Esmolol.
