= Butylated hydroxytoluene =

Antioxidant

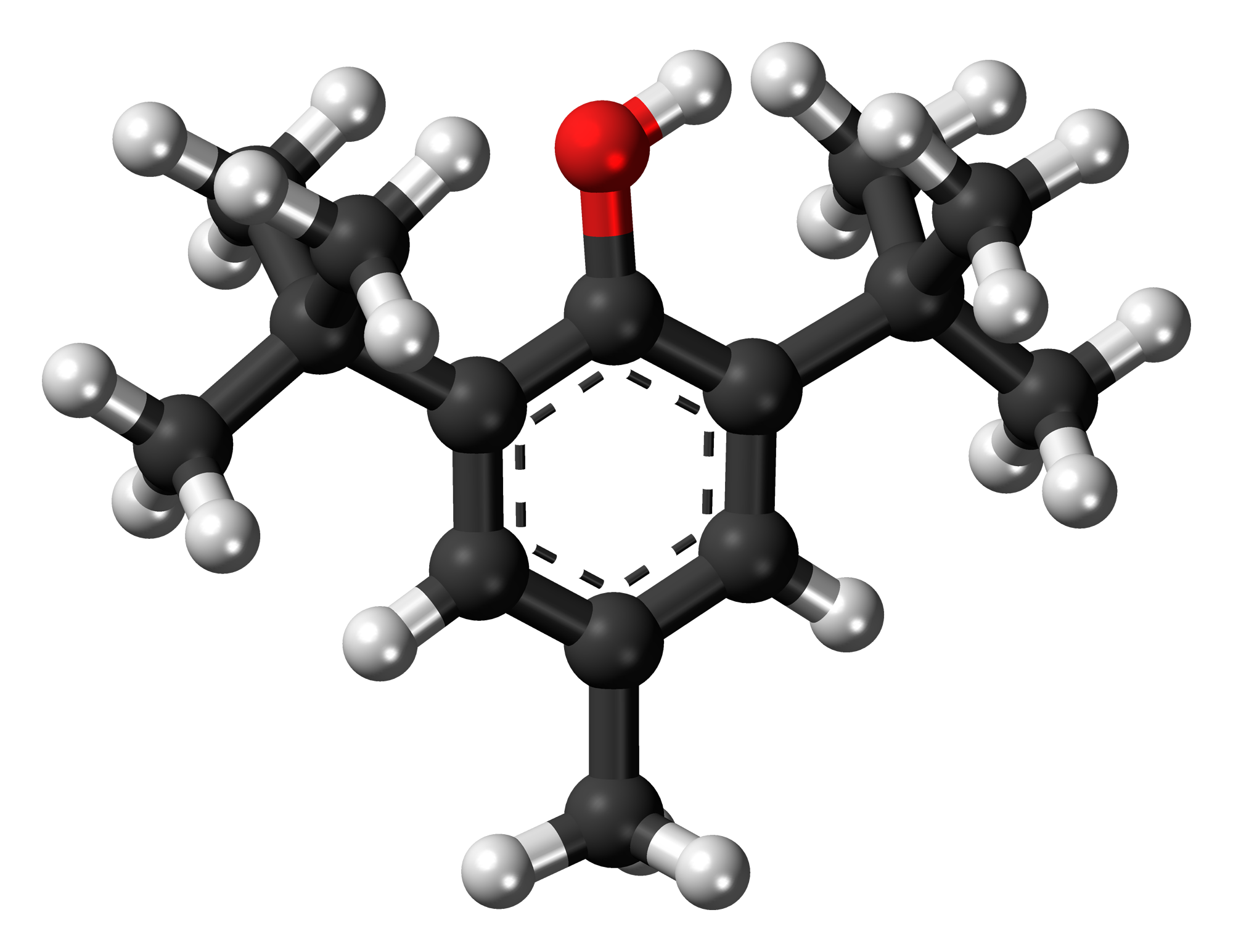

Names
- Preferred IUPAC name 2,6-Di-tert-butyl-4-methylphenol
- Other names: 2,6-Di-tert-butyl-p-cresol; 2,6-DI-tert-butyl-4-methylphenol; 3,5-Di-tert-butyl-4-hydroxytoluene; 2,6 ditertiary-butyl-4-methyl phenol; DBPC; BHT; E321; AO-29; Avox BHT; Antioxidant 264; Additin RC 7110; Dibutylated hydroxytoluene; 4-Methyl-2,6-di-tert-butyl phenol; 3,5-(Dimethylethyl)-4-hydroxytoluene

Identifiers
CAS Number	128-37-0
3D model (JSmol)	Interactive image
ChEBI	CHEBI:34247
ChEMBL	ChEMBL146
ChemSpider	13835296
ECHA InfoCard	100.004.439
EC Number	204-881-4
E number	E321 (antioxidants, ...)
KEGG	D02413
PubChem CID	31404
RTECS number	GO7875000
UNII	1P9D0Z171K
CompTox Dashboard (EPA)	DTXSID2020216
- InChI: InChI=1S/C15H24O/c1-10-8-11(14(2,3)4)13(16)12(9-10)15(5,6)7/h8-9,16H,1-7H3 Key: NLZUEZXRPGMBCV-UHFFFAOYSA-N; InChI=1/C15H24O/c1-10-8-11(14(2,3)4)13(16)12(9-10)15(5,6)7/h8-9,16H,1-7H3 Key: NLZUEZXRPGMBCV-UHFFFAOYAU
- SMILES: CC(C)(C)c1cc(C)cc(c1O)C(C)(C)C

Properties
Chemical formula	C_{15}H_{24}O
Molar mass	220.356 g/mol
Appearance	White to yellow powder
Odor	Slight, phenolic
Density	1.048 g/cm^{3}
Melting point	70 °C (158 °F; 343 K)
Boiling point	265 °C (509 °F; 538 K)
Solubility in water	1.1 mg/L (20 °C)
log P	5.32
Vapor pressure	0.01 mmHg (20 °C)

Hazards
- Occupational safety and health (OHS/OSH)
Main hazards	Flammable
- GHS labelling
Pictograms	(GHS09: Environmental hazard)
Signal word	Warning
Hazard statements	H410
Precautionary statements	P273, P391, P501
NFPA 704 (fire diamond)	2 1 0
Flash point	127 °C (261 °F; 400 K)
- Lethal dose or concentration (LD, LC)
LD_{50} (median dose)	> 2,000 mg/kg (dermal, rat)
- NIOSH (US health exposure limits)
PEL (Permissible)	None
REL (Recommended)	TWA 10 mg/m^{3}
IDLH (Immediate danger)	N.D.
- Safety data sheet (SDS)

Related compounds
Related compounds	Butylated hydroxyanisole
- Except where otherwise noted, data are given for materials in their standard state (at 25 °C [77 °F], 100 kPa). verify (what is ?) Infobox references

Butylated hydroxytoluene (BHT), also known as dibutylhydroxytoluene, is a lipophilic organic compound, chemically a derivative of phenol, that is useful for its antioxidant properties and is widely used as a food preservative in different parts of the world. BHT is widely used to prevent free radical-mediated oxidation in fluids (e.g. fuels, oils) and other materials, and the regulations overseen by the US FDA—which considers BHT to be "generally recognized as safe"—allow small amounts to be added to foods. Despite this, and the earlier determination by the National Cancer Institute that BHT was noncarcinogenic in an animal model, societal concerns over its broad use have been expressed.

== Natural occurrence ==
Phytoplankton, including the green algae Botryococcus braunii, as well as three different cyanobacteria (Cylindrospermopsis raciborskii, Microcystis aeruginosa and Oscillatoria sp.) are capable of producing BHT as a natural product. The halophyte plant mesembryanthemum crystallinum also produces BHT, as does the lychee fruit in its pericarp.

Several fungi (for example Aspergillus conicus) living in olives produce BHT. Volatile organic compounds such as BHT and cresol are produced by resident fungi when olives are being stored awaiting pressing.

It has been detected in higher plants and herbivorous insects, but it is not clear whether the BHT is produced by the plant, the insect, or some other organism living in association.

== Production ==
=== Industrial production ===
The chemical synthesis of BHT in industry has involved the reaction of p-cresol (4-methylphenol) with isobutylene (2-methylpropene), catalyzed by sulfuric acid:

CH_{3}(C_{6}H_{4})OH + 2 CH_{2}=C(CH_{3})_{2} → ((CH_{3})_{3}C)_{2}CH_{3}C_{6}H_{2}OH

Alternatively, BHT has been prepared from 2,6-di-tert-butylphenol by hydroxymethylation or aminomethylation followed by hydrogenolysis.

== Reactions ==
The species behaves as a synthetic analog of vitamin E, primarily acting as a terminating agent that suppresses autoxidation, a process whereby unsaturated (usually) organic compounds are attacked by atmospheric oxygen. BHT stops this autocatalytic reaction by converting peroxy radicals to hydroperoxides. It effects this function by donating a hydrogen atom:

RO_{2}• + ArOH → ROOH + ArO•
RO_{2}• + ArO• → nonradical products

where R is alkyl or aryl, and where ArOH is BHT or related phenolic antioxidants. Each BHT consumes two peroxy radicals. The electron-donating alkyl groups on the ortho and para positions of BHT increase the electron density of the phenolic hydroxyl moiety through the inductive effect and the hyperconjugation effect, reduce the bond dissociation energy of the phenolic hydroxyl group, and enhance its reactivity to lipid free radicals. Meanwhile, the phenoxy radical generated by BHT is stabilized due to the delocalization of unpaired electrons around the aromatic ring and the steric hindrance effect of ortho tert-butyl groups. Isobutene is one of the possible degradation products formed by BHT oxidation with computational studies suggesting that there are two possible mechanism that can lead to isobutene formation with the OH addition pathways at the C2 site of BHT more likely to result in isobutene formation than pathways of H abstracts from the t-butyl group.

== Applications ==
BHT is listed by the NIH Hazardous Substances Data Bank under several categories in catalogues and databases, such as food additive, household product ingredient, industrial additive, personal care product and cosmetic ingredient, pesticide ingredient, plastic and rubber ingredient and medical and veterinary research.

=== Food additive ===
BHT is primarily used as an antioxidant food additive. In the United States, it is classified as generally recognized as safe (GRAS) based on a National Cancer Institute study from 1979 in rats and mice. It is approved for use in the U.S. by the Food and Drug Administration: For example, 21 CFR § 137.350(a)(4) allows BHT up to 0.0033% by weight in "enriched rice", while 9 CFR § 381.147](f)(1) allows up to 0.01% in poultry "by fat content". It is permitted in the European Union under E321.

BHT is used as a preservative ingredient in some foods. With this usage BHT maintains freshness or prevents spoilage; it may be used to decrease the rate at which the texture, color, or flavor of food changes.

Some food companies have voluntarily eliminated BHT from their products or have announced that they were going to phase it out.

=== Antioxidant ===
BHT is also used as an antioxidant in products such as metalworking fluids, cosmetics, pharmaceuticals, rubber, transformer oils, and embalming fluid. In the petroleum industry, where BHT is known as the fuel additive AO-29 (Innospec), it is used in hydraulic fluids, turbine and gear oils, and jet fuels. BHT is also used to prevent peroxide formation in organic ethers and other solvents and laboratory chemicals. It is added to certain monomers as a polymerisation inhibitor to facilitate their safe storage. Some additive products contain BHT as their primary ingredient, while others contain the chemical merely as a component of their formulation, sometimes alongside butylated hydroxyanisole (BHA).

=== Cosmetics ===
The European Union restricts the use of BHT in mouthwash to 0.001% concentration, in toothpaste to 0.01% concentration, and to 0.8% in other cosmetics.

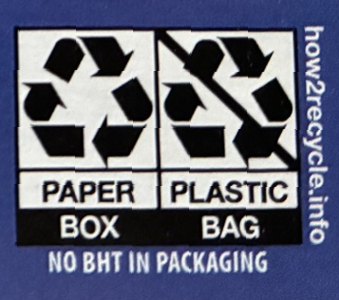
Food packaging label "no BHT in food packaging"

== Health effects ==
Like many closely related phenolic antioxidants, BHT has low acute toxicity (e.g., the desmethyl analog of BHT, 2,6-di-tert-butylphenol, has an LD_{50} of >9 g/kg). The US Food and Drug Administration classifies BHT as generally recognized as safe (GRAS) food preservative when used in an approved manner. In 1979, the National Cancer Institute determined that BHT was noncarcinogenic in a mouse model.

The World Health Organization discussed a possible link between BHT and cancer risk in a 1986 report concluding there is limited evidence for carcinogenicity from animal studies. Primary research studies in the 1970s–1990s reported both potential for increased risk and potential for decreased risk in the area of oncology. A review report published in 2002 noted that BHT has shown anticarcinogenic effects, no effect, or tumor promoting effects depending on animal species and target organ considered. Because of this uncertainty, the Center for Science in the Public Interest puts BHT in its "caution" column and recommends avoiding it.
