= XGI (disambiguation) =

XGI is XGI Technology Inc., a computer graphics company.

XGI or xgi may also refer to:

- Ruger XGI, a rifle
- Biri language (ISO 639: xgi)
