= XM25 =

XM25 can be:

- XM25 CDTE, a grenade launcher with computerized air burst rounds
- XM25 Sniper Rifle
