= Springfield Armory M1A =

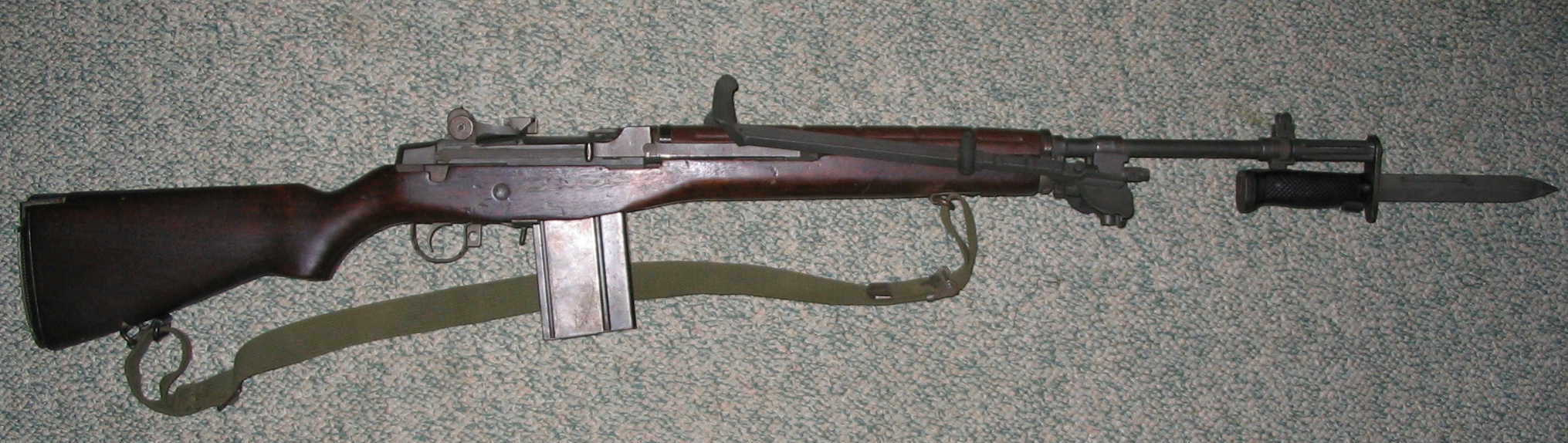
- Springfield Armory M1A with bipod and M6 bayonet
- Type: Semi-automatic rifle
- Place of origin: United States

Production history
- Designer: Elmer C. Ballance in Devine, Texas
- Designed: 1971
- Manufacturer: Springfield Armory, Inc.
- Unit cost: Depends on model
- Produced: 1971–present
- Variants: Standard, Loaded, National Match, Super Match, M21, M25, SOCOM 16, Scout Squad, SOCOM II, Tanker

Specifications
- Mass: 7.8–11.6 pounds (empty magazine)
- Length: 37.25–44.33 inches (946–1126 mm)
- Barrel length: 16–22 inches (406–559 mm)
- Cartridge: 7.62×51mm NATO.308 Winchester; 6.5mm Creedmoor
- Action: Gas-operated, rotating bolt
- Rate of fire: Semi-automatic
- Feed system: Detachable box magazine
- Sights: National Match front blade, match-grade hooded aperture with one-half minute adj. for windage and elevation.

The Springfield Armory M1A is a semi-automatic rifle made by Springfield Armory, Inc., beginning in 1971, based on the M14 rifle, for the civilian and law enforcement markets in the United States. "M1A" is a proprietary name for Springfield Armory's M14-pattern rifle. Early M1A rifles were built with surplus G.I. parts until Springfield Armory, Inc. began manufacturing their own. Robert Reese bought Springfield Armory from Elmer Ballance and moved the manufacturing from Devine, Texas, to Geneseo, Illinois, in 1974.

== Differences between the M1A and M14 ==
The M14 was developed to take the place of four different weapons systems: the M1 Garand, M1 carbine, M3 submachine gun, and M1918 Browning Automatic Rifle (BAR). It was thought that in this manner the M14 could simplify the logistical requirements of the troops by limiting the types of ammunition and parts needed to be supplied. It proved to be an impossible task to replace all four as the cartridge was too powerful for the submachine gun role and the weapon was too light to serve as a light machine gun replacement for the BAR.

The Springfield Armory M1A is, for the most part, identical to the M14. There are, however, a few important differences:

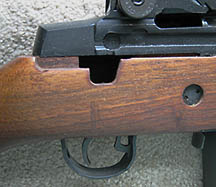
Selector switch cutout in M1A stock manufactured in 1997

M1A receivers are made from precision investment cast AISI 8620 alloy steel. The military M14 receivers were manufactured using the drop forge process, which is more complicated and more expensive. Until around the late 1990s, the M1A produced by Springfield Armory retained the cutout in the rear right of the stock for the selector switch found on the M14. Springfield Armory has also omitted the "7.62-MM" caliber designator on the M1A receiver since 1991.

Once the Federal Assault Weapons Ban of 1994 was passed prohibiting the manufacture of firearms with bayonet lugs (among other features), the M1A no longer shipped with a bayonet lug. Although the 1994 law expired in September 2004, making bayonet lugs on newly manufactured firearms legal again (in most states), Springfield Armory has not restored that feature. Since the bayonet lug is attached to the flash suppressor, "post-ban" rifles can easily be fitted with a bayonet lug by fitting a pre-ban flash suppressor.

The California Assault Weapons Ban prohibits flash suppressors on all semi-automatic rifles capable of accepting a detachable magazine. As a result, Springfield Armory designed a muzzle brake, which they installed in place of the standard flash suppressor on all models that were sold in California. The muzzle brake reduces rearward recoil, making the rifle easier to control.

== M1A/M14 select fire rifles ==
Most of the M1A rifles manufactured since 1971 were made for the commercial market and thus were only capable of semi-automatic fire. Springfield Armory, Inc. and Smith Enterprise Inc. were the two companies that produced select fire M14-type rifles for civilian ownership. Up until May 1986, Springfield Armory, Inc. had a Full Auto Department at their factory in Illinois. A few M1A rifles were converted to select fire and registered with the ATF by Class II manufacturers like Neal Smith and Rock Island Armory. The receivers of these select fire rifles have the selector lug and operating rod rail cuts for the connector assembly.

== Variants ==
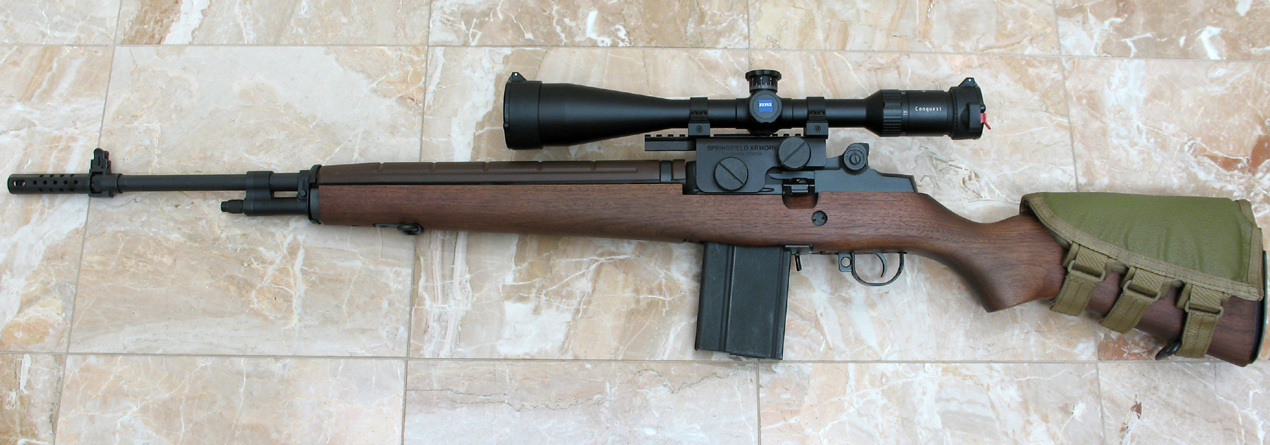
Springfield Armory M1A National Match

Besides the standard M1A, Springfield Armory also produces multiple variants. The M21 Tactical and M25 White Feather have been discontinued.

=== Loaded rifles ===
The Loaded variants are available with either a walnut or synthetic stock, and one model comes with a Precision Adjustable Stock. All Loaded models include the following features:

- Barrel: air-gauged medium-weight National Match (available in stainless steel or Parkerized chrome moly steel), 22 inches (56 cm) in length with a 1:11 right-hand twist.
- Front Sight: National Match .062” Military Post
- Rear Sight: GI Match Grade Non-hooded Rear Sight: Aperture .0520, Adjustable, One-half Minute for Windage and One Minute for Elevation
- Two-stage Military Trigger, Match Tuned, 4.5 to 5.0 pounds-force (20 to 22 N)

The Loaded models do not have the action glass bedded into the stock as do the National Match models.

=== Match rifles ===
Two M1As are advertised as match rifles, the National Match M1A and the Super Match M1A. The National Match is a more basic model, while the Super Match is more customizable has additional features on some models such as a McMillan stock and a Douglas stainless steel barrel.

=== Scout Squad ===
The Scout Squad is an M1A marketed toward law enforcement users. It has an 18-inch (46 cm) barrel, a forward-mounted optical sight base, and a proprietary muzzle stabilizer. It is advertised as being optimal for Aimpoint optics, although most mounts attached to the factory accessory rail will still require a cheekrest in order to get the proper weld. It is available in both wood-stocked and synthetic furniture options with different colors of wood and synthetic stocks.

=== SOCOM rifles ===
Springfield Armory M1A SOCOM
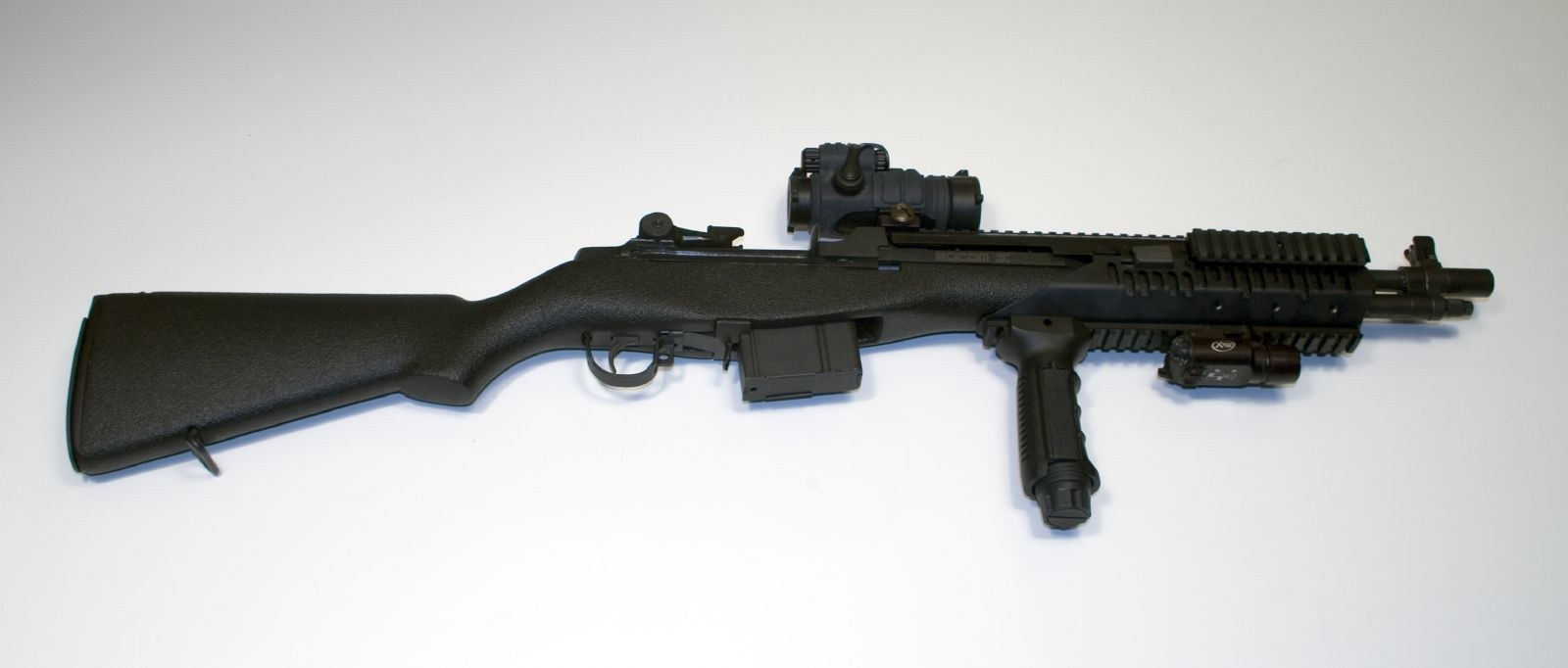
- An M1A SOCOM II chambered for .308 Winchester
- Type: Battle rifle
- Place of origin: United States

Production history
- Designed: 2004
- Manufacturer: Springfield Armory, Inc.
- Produced: 2004–present

Specifications
- Mass: 8.8 lb (4.0 kg) (with empty magazine)
- Length: 37.25 in (946 mm)
- Barrel length: 16.25 in (413 mm)
- Cartridge: 7.62×51mm NATO.308 Winchester
- Action: Gas-operated, rotating bolt, self-loading
- Rate of fire: Semi-automatic
- Muzzle velocity: 762 metres per second (2,500 ft/s)
- Feed system: M14 detachable box magazines
- Sights: XS Sights post with tritium inserts (front) / Enlarged military aperture (ghost ring) adjustable for windage and elevation (rear)

The SOCOM 16 and SOCOM II are modern variants of the M14 produced with lighter materials. SOCOM is an abbreviation which refers to the United States Special Operations Command. These variants have a barrel that is slightly longer than the minimum barrel length of 16 inches (410 mm) permissible without taxing and registration under the National Firearms Act in the United States. The gas system was reworked to ensure proper operation with the shortened barrel, and a new muzzle brake was added to help soften recoil.

The SOCOM 16 was introduced in 2004, with the SOCOM II being introduced the following year; they are essentially the same except for their accessory rails. An uncommon variant called the SOCOM II Extended Cluster Rail features a longer top rail that extends over the ejection port to the stripper clip guide, letting the operator mount optics further to the rear. It appears the SOCOM II was discontinued toward the end of 2014. The SOCOM 16 CQB (close-quarters battle), a SOCOM 16 with a pistol grip and telescoping stock, was introduced in early 2016.

The SOCOM 16 and SOCOM II are largely identical to the standard M1A, but feature a 16.25-inch (413 mm) barrel, rather than the standard model's 22-inch (560 mm) barrel. The muzzle brake is designed to reduce the increased recoil produced by the shorter barrel. In addition to the top accessory rail for optics, the rifle has enclosed Garand-style iron sights, with tritium inserts for low or dim light conditions. The rifle will accept any M14 magazine, with typical capacities of 5, 10, or 20 rounds.

The only difference between the SOCOM 16 and SOCOM II is the Picatinny rails. The SOCOM 16 features a short length of Picatinny rail in front of the action, above the handguard, while the SOCOM II features a continuous top Picatinny rail from just ahead of the action to the front of the handguard, and shorter lengths of rail on the sides and bottom of the handguard. The extra Picatinny rails allow for more attachments, including scopes, grips, lights, and lasers, but also means the SOCOM II weighs 10 pounds (4.5 kg), compared to the SOCOM 16's 8.8 pounds (4.0 kg). Since the rails add weight at the front of the weapon, it is more muzzle-heavy than the SOCOM 16, making it harder for some users to quickly engage multiple targets.

== See also ==
- M21 Sniper Weapon System
- Ruger XGI
