= Adjustable Ranging Telescope =

Weapons sighting system

The Adjustable Ranging Telescope (ART) is a weapons sighting system typically used as a military rifle scope which was initially designed for service in the Vietnam War. It was developed and patented by James M. Leatherwood. It combines a range-finding scale inside of a telescopic sight with an adjustable cam integrated into the scope's mount. This raises or lowers the rear of the outer sight to compensate for the ballistic rise or fall of the projectile. The cam is preset for a specific cartridge, i.e., the 7.62 mm NATO round. Since the range cam is locked to the magnification ring, it automatically sets the range and adjusts for the ballistic drop of the shot. This then allows the shooter to place the optic's aiming point directly on the target.

During the Vietnam War, Lieutenant Leatherwood, who already had the patents for his ART system, entered the Army and began working with U.S. Army Ordnance specialists. The combination of the Leatherwood Adjustable Ranging Telescope (ART) with M14 National Match rifles went on to create the M21 Sniper Rifle.
