= M21 Sniper Weapon System =

American sniper rifle

Rifle, 7.62 mm, Sniper Rifle, M21
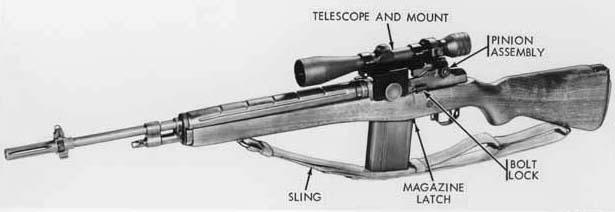
- M21 sniper rifle
- Type: Designated marksman rifle Sniper rifle
- Place of origin: United States

Service history
- In service: 1968–present
- Used by: See Users
- Wars: Vietnam War; Laotian Civil War; Cambodian Civil War; 1982 Lebanon War; Lebanese Civil War; Salvadoran Civil War; Iraq War; War in Afghanistan

Production history
- Designer: Marines Weapons Command; Combat Development Command; Limited Warfare Agency
- Designed: 1968
- Manufacturer: Rock Island Arsenal; Springfield Armory; Smith Enterprise, Inc.
- Variants: M25

Specifications
- Mass: 5.27 kg (11.6 lb)
- Length: 1118 mm (44 in)
- Barrel length: 560 mm (22 in)
- Cartridge: 7.62×51mm NATO
- Caliber: 7.62mm
- Action: Gas-operated, rotating bolt
- Muzzle velocity: 853 m/s (2,800 ft/s)
- Effective firing range: 460 m (500 yd); 900 m (980 yd) (with 3–9× scope)
- Maximum firing range: 3,725 m (4,074 yd)
- Feed system: 5-, 10-, or 20-round detachable box magazine
- Sights: Front: National Match front blade. Rear: Match-grade hooded aperture with one-half minute adjustments for both windage and elevation 26 3/4 in sight radius.

The M21 Sniper Weapon System (SWS) in the US Army is a national match grade M14 rifle, selected for accuracy, and renamed the M21 rifle. The M21 uses a commercially procured 3–9× variable power telescopic sight, modified for use with the sniper rifle. It is chambered for the 7.62×51mm NATO cartridge.

== Overview ==
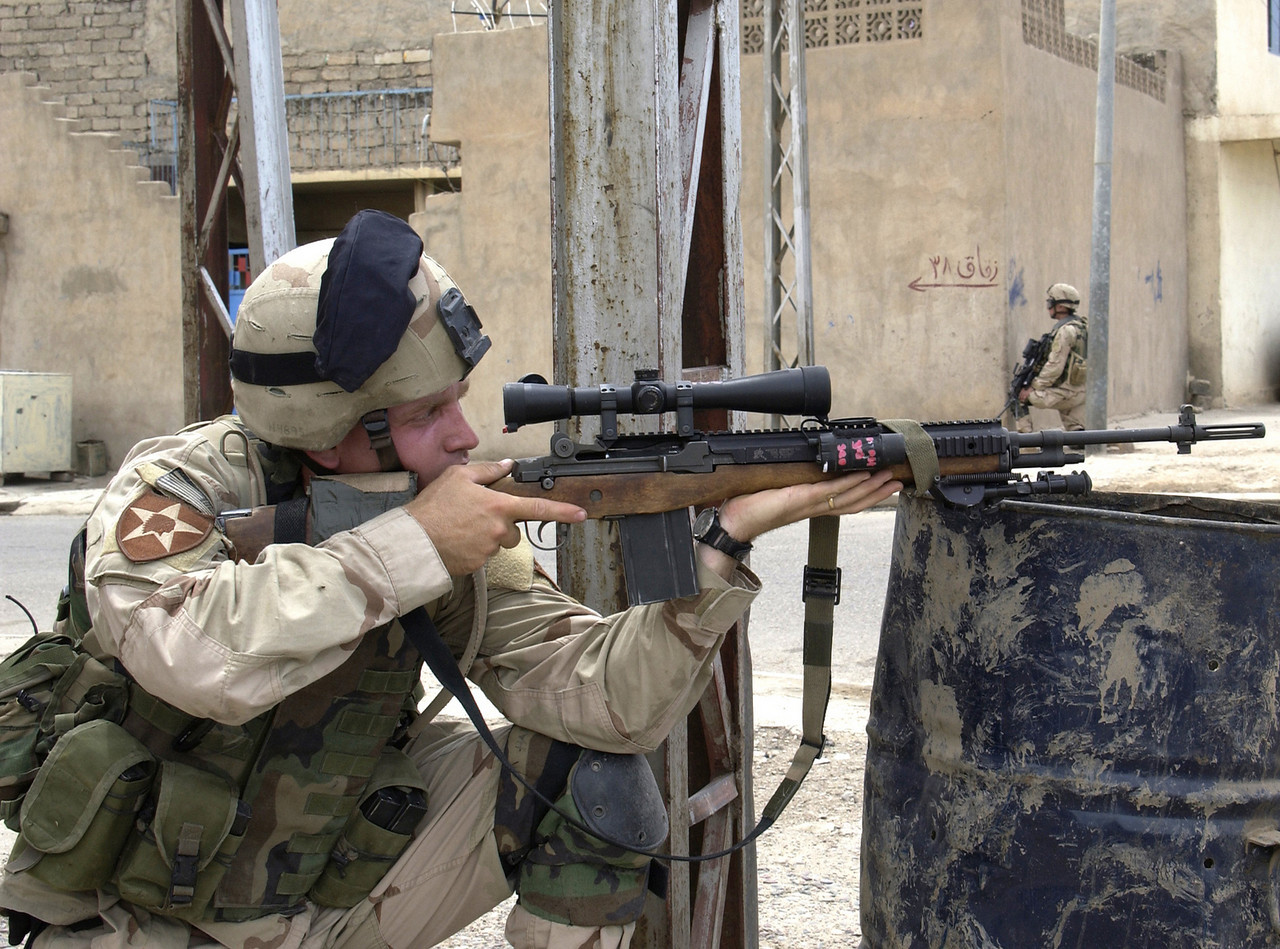
A sniper of the 1st Battalion, 23rd Infantry Regiment, 2nd Infantry Division, U.S. Army, takes aim with an M21 while on patrol on an urban Iraqi street, on 13 May 2004.

The use of "sharpshooters" (or snipers) can be traced in U.S. military history from the time of the Revolutionary War of 1775–1781. Every U.S. military action since that time has required the special talent of such men. From 1955 to 1956, the United States Army Marksmanship Training Unit undertook a program to "reiterate the lessons learned" from past wars. However, this program was short-lived. The prevailing military attitude then envisioned any future conflict as nuclear with defeat or victory decided in hours.

With the adoption of the M14 service rifle, no provision was made for an M14 sniper rifle, [and] the designation of a sniper in the rifle squad was discontinued. The conflict in Vietnam revived the need for snipers. Snipers became optional and no table of organization and equipment (TOE) authorized sniper organizations [units]." However, units could train and deploy snipers on a limited basis depending upon...requirements. As a result, U.S. Army snipers were trained in country in South Vietnam at Division. During the Vietnam War, U.S. Marines snipers were issued bolt-action hunting rifles, U.S. Army snipers were issued XM21 rifles. The Rock Island Arsenal converted 1,435 National Match (target grade) M14s by adding a 3-9x Redfield Adjustable Ranging Telescope (ART) and provided National Match grade (7.62 Lake City Long Range XM-118) ammunition. The ART scope, designed by 2nd Lieutenant James Leatherwood (U.S. Army), combined rangefinding and bullet drop compensation. The innovation came just in time as the U.S. military found itself losing servicemen to Viet Cong snipers who had the home field advantage in terrain that was difficult.

This version, designated as the XM21, had a specially selected walnut stock and was first fielded in the second half of 1969. An improved version with a fiberglass stock was designated the M21 in 1972. The M21 remained the Army's primary sniper rifle until 1988, when it was replaced by the M24 Sniper Weapon System; some M21s were later re-issued and used in the Iraq War.

In standard military use, the M21 uses a 20-round box magazine as the other members of the M14 family and weighs 11 pounds (5.27 kg) without the scope. The U.S. military never officially authorized or purchased magazines in any other capacity, although 5- and 10-round magazines are available.

The M21 was criticized by an internal Fort Benning publication in 1989 warning that "The M21...cannot be maintained under field conditions, and its inflexible design makes it highly susceptible to malfunctions" due to the scope not being easily removable if needed and the glass bedded action that made disassembly in the field problematic.

== Service ==
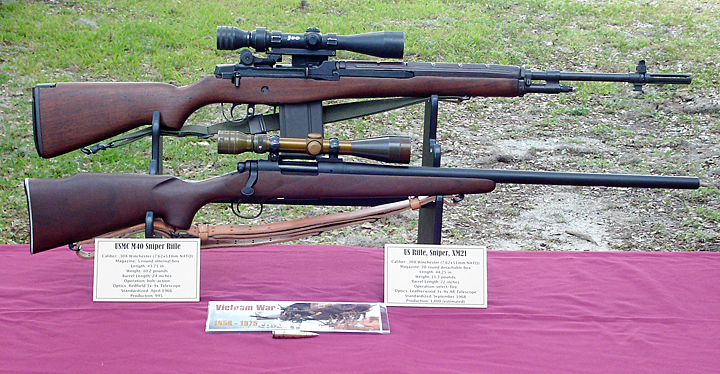
Vietnam War era sniper rifles, US Army XM21 (top) and USMC M40 (bottom)

The XM21 Sniper Weapon System was issued to U.S. Army snipers during the Vietnam War, along with a commercially available sniper scope for day use, and a PVS-2 starlight scope for night operations. These men were trained at Army Division Base Camps; if a unit in country was a Brigade, Battalion, or smaller, and that unit requested snipers for their units, the requesting unit could send their sniper applicant to the next closest Division, such as Camp Eagle, 101st (Airmobile) Airborne Division, if that requesting unit was located in I Corps (Military Region 1), Republic of South Vietnam. The newly designated M21 saw limited actions during military operations after the Vietnam War ended in 1975. It was used by the U.S. Army Rangers during the Invasion of Grenada in 1983. There are limited numbers in some Army National Guard units and in a few specialized active units such as the OPFOR units of the Joint Readiness Training Center.

The XM21 served from 1969 to 1975, and the M21 officially served as the main Army sniper rifle from 1975 to 1988 until the introduction of the M24, which had supplanted the M21 in Ranger Battalions by 1990. However, many M14 and M21 variants came back into favor in the Iraq and Afghan wars in the 2000s.

== Users ==
- El Salvador
- Israel
- Philippines: Standard issue sniper rifle for regular infantry units of the Philippine Army. Being refurbished by Government Arsenal, while replacing key parts including installing new optics.
- Tunisia
- United States: Former primary sniper rifle of United States Army; replaced as a sniper rifle by the M24 Sniper Weapon System in 1988 with limited usage in squad designated marksman roles persisting until being replaced by the M-14 EBR-RI and M110 beginning in 2008.

=== Former ===
- Panama: Formerly used by the defunct Panama Defense Forces

== See also ==
- M25 Sniper Weapon System
- Springfield Armory M1A
- M110 Semi-Automatic Sniper System
