= Ruger XGI =

- Type: Semi-automatic rifle
- Place of origin: United States

Production history
- Manufacturer: Sturm, Ruger & Co.

Specifications
- Cartridge: .308 Winchester.243 Winchester
- Action: Gas-operated, rotating bolt
- Feed system: 5-round magazine (Compatible with M14 and Springfield Armory M1A magazines.)
- Sights: Iron sights

The Ruger XGI was a semi-automatic rifle chambered in .308 Winchester or .243 Winchester. The XGI's function and aesthetics were influenced by the Ruger Mini-14, only sized up to the larger, more powerful .308 and .243 calibers. The rifle was advertised in the 1980s but never entered production.

== History ==
Although the XGI was advertised in 1984–1986, it never entered production due to unresolved mechanical and production issues.

== Development ==
As with the Mini-14, the action was based on the M1 Garand service rifle. The rifle featured a one-piece hardwood stock, a metal-lined fiber glass handguard, and a rubber buttplate.
