= M14 rifle =

American battle rifle

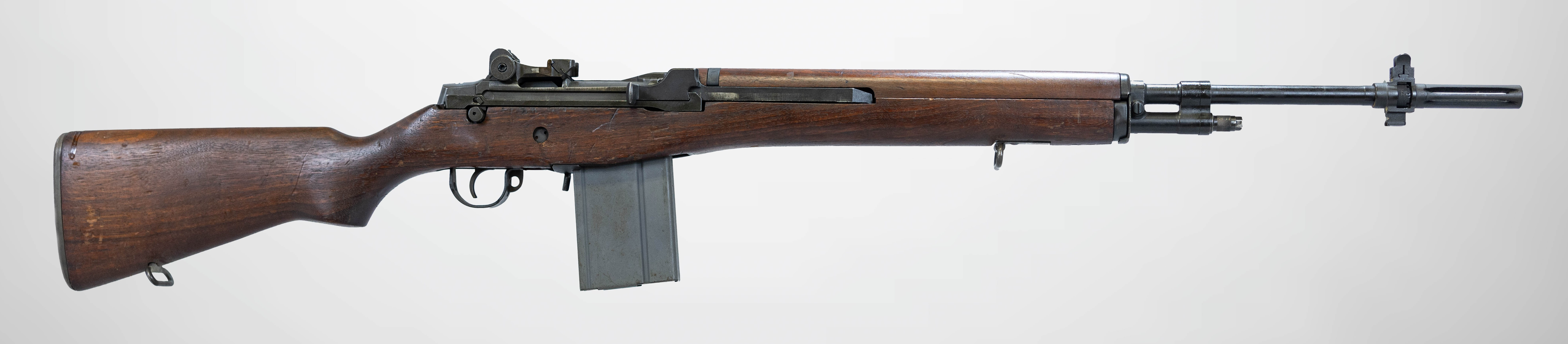
- An M14 rifle shown with a 20-round magazine
- Type: Battle rifle
- Place of origin: United States

Service history
- In service: 1957–present; 1957–1964 (as the standard U.S. service rifle)
- Used by: See Users
- Wars: See Conflicts

Production history
- Designed: 1954
- Manufacturer: Springfield Armory; Winchester; Harrington & Richardson; Thompson-Ramo-Wooldridge, Inc.
- Produced: 1957–1980
- No. built: 1.3 million
- Variants: See Variants

Specifications
- Mass: 9.2 pounds (4.2 kg) empty; 10.7 pounds (4.9 kg) with loaded magazine
- Length: 44.3 in (1,126 mm)
- Barrel length: 22 in (559 mm)
- Cartridge: 7.62×51mm NATO (.308 in)
- Action: Gas-operated, rotating bolt
- Rate of fire: 700–750 rounds/min
- Muzzle velocity: 2,800 ft/s (853 m/s)
- Effective firing range: 500 yd (457 m); 875 yd (800 m)/3,725 yd (3,406 m) maximum range
- Feed system: stripper clips; 20-round detachable box magazines
- Sights: Aperture rear sight, "barleycorn" front sight

The M14 rifle is an American battle rifle chambered for the 7.62×51mm NATO cartridge. It was accepted as the service rifle of the United States Armed Forces in 1957, with production starting in 1959. The M14 replaced the semi-automatic M1 Garand in US service.

In 1967, it was officially replaced as the US "Standard A" service rifle by the M16 assault rifle, a lighter weapon with a smaller 5.56×45mm intermediate cartridge. The M14 remained in use by the U.S. Army, Navy, and Marine Corps for Basic and Advanced Individual Training from the mid-1960s to the early 1970s.

The M14 rifle remains in limited service across all branches of the U.S. military, with variants used as sniper and designated marksman rifles, accurized competition weapons, and ceremonial weapons by honor guards, color guards, drill teams, and ceremonial guards. Civilian semi-automatic variants are used for hunting, target shooting, and shooting competitions.

The M14 served as the basis for the M21 and M25 sniper rifles, which were eventually replaced by the M24 Sniper Weapon System. A new variant of the M14, the Mk 14 Enhanced Battle Rifle, has been in very limited service since 2002.

== History ==
=== Early development ===
The M14's development stemmed from an extensive line of experimental weapons based on the M1 Garand rifle. Although the M1 was among the most advanced infantry rifle designs of the late 1930s, it was not without faults, as various modifications to the basic M1 were considered during the last months of World War II. Changes included the addition of fully automatic fire and the replacement of the eight-round en bloc clip with a detachable box magazine holding 20 rounds. Winchester, Remington, and Springfield Armory's John Garand offered alternate conversions. Garand's design, the T20, was the most popular, and T20 prototypes served as the basis for several Springfield test rifles from 1945 to the early 1950s.

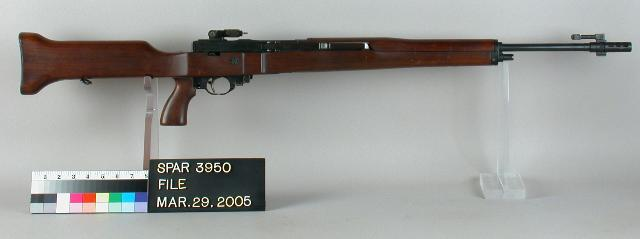
T25 prototype

In 1945, Earle Harvey of Springfield Armory designed an entirely different rifle, the T25, for the new T65 .30 light rifle cartridge (7.62×49mm). This was at the direction of Col. Rene Studler, then serving in the Pentagon. Harvey and Studler were then transferred to Springfield Armory in late 1945, to continuously develop the T25. The T25 was designed to use the T65 service cartridge, a Frankford Arsenal design based upon the .30-06 cartridge used in the M1, but shortened to the same length as the .300 Savage.

Although shorter than the .30-06, meaning less powder capacity, the T65 cartridge retained the ballistics and energy of the .30-06, which can be attributed to the use of a recently developed ball powder designed by Olin Industries. After experimenting with several bullet designs, the T65 was finalized for adoption as the 7.62×51mm NATO cartridge. Olin Industries later introduced the cartridge to the commercial market as the .308 Winchester. After a series of revisions by Earle Harvey and the other members of the .30 light rifle design group following the 1950 Fort Benning tests, the T25 was renamed the T47.

The T44 prototype rifle was a conventional design developed at Springfield Armory as an alternative to the T47. With minimal funding available, the earliest T44 prototypes used T20E2 receivers fitted with magazine filler blocks and rebarreled for the 7.62×51mm cartridge. The long operating rod/piston of the M1 was replaced by the T47's gas cut-off system. Though not principally designed by any single engineer, Lloyd Corbett is credited for several refinements to the T44 design. Refinements included the addition of a bolt roller intended to reduce friction and a straight operating rod.

=== Infantry Board service rifle trials ===
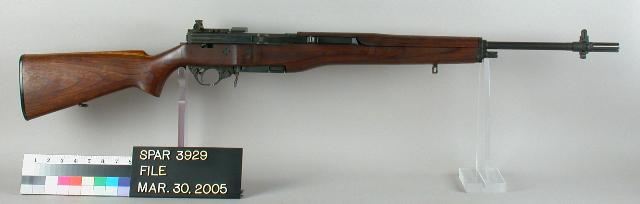
An experimental T47 rifle

The T44 was tested in a competitive service rifle competition conducted by the Infantry Board at Fort Benning, Georgia against the Springfield T47 (a modified T25) and the T48, a variant of Fabrique Nationale's FN FAL. The T47 did not have a bolt roller and performed worse than both the T44 and the T48 in dust and cold-weather tests. Thus, it was dropped from consideration in 1953. During 1952–53, testing proved the T48 and the T44 to be roughly comparable in performance, with the T48 holding an advantage in ease of field stripping and dust resistance, and a longer product development lead time.

During the winter of 1953–54, both rifles competed in the winter rifle trials at U.S. Army facilities in the Arctic. Springfield Armory engineers, anxious to ensure the selection of the T44, had been specially preparing and modifying the test T44 rifles for weeks with the aid of the armory's cold chamber, including a redesign of the T44 gas regulator and custom modifications to magazines and other parts to reduce friction and seizing in extreme cold.

The T48 rifles received no such special preparation and in the continued cold-weather testing began to experience sluggish gas system functioning, aggravated by the T48's close-fitting surfaces between bolt and carrier, and carrier and receiver. FN engineers opened the gas ports in an attempt to improve functioning, but this caused early/violent extraction and broken parts as a result of the increased pressures. As a result, the T44 was ranked superior in cold-weather operation to the T48. The Arctic Test Board report made it clear that the T48 needed improvement and that the U.S. would not adopt the T48 until it had successfully completed another round of Arctic tests the following winter.

In June 1954, funding became available to manufacture newly fabricated T44 receivers specially designed for the shorter T65 cartridge. This single change to the T44 design saved a pound over the M1 Garand. Tests at Fort Benning with the T44 and T48 continued through the summer and fall of 1956. By this time, the T48/FAL rifles had been so improved that malfunction rates were almost as low as the T44.

The T44 was selected over the T48/FAL due to lower weight, simplicity with fewer parts, the T44's self-compensating gas system, and because the T44 could supposedly be manufactured on existing machinery built for the M1 rifle (which was later found to be false). In 1957, the U.S. formally adopted the T44 as the U.S. infantry service rifle designated M14.

=== Production contracts ===
Initial production contracts for the M14 were awarded to the Springfield Armory, Winchester, and Harrington & Richardson. Thompson-Ramo-Wooldridge Inc. (TRW) was later awarded a production contract for the rifle, as well. In all, 1,376,031 M14 service rifles were produced from 1959 to 1964.

==== National Match M14 ====
Springfield Armory produced 6,641 new M14 NM rifles in 1962 and 1963. TRW produced 4,874 new M14 NM rifles in 1964. Springfield Armory upgraded 2,094 M14 rifles in 1965 and 2,395 M14 rifles in 1966 to National Match specifications. 2,462 M14 rifles were rebuilt to National Match standards in 1967 at the Rock Island Arsenal. In total, 11,130 National Match rifles were delivered by Springfield Armory, Rock Island Arsenal, and TRW during 1962–1967.

Production M14 rifles made by Springfield Armory and Winchester used forged receivers and bolts milled from AISI 8620 steel, a low-carbon steel with added molybdenum-chromium. Harrington & Richardson M14 production used AISI 8620 steel, as well, except for 10 receivers milled from AISI 1330 low-carbon steel and a single receiver made from a high-nickel alloy steel.

=== Deployment ===
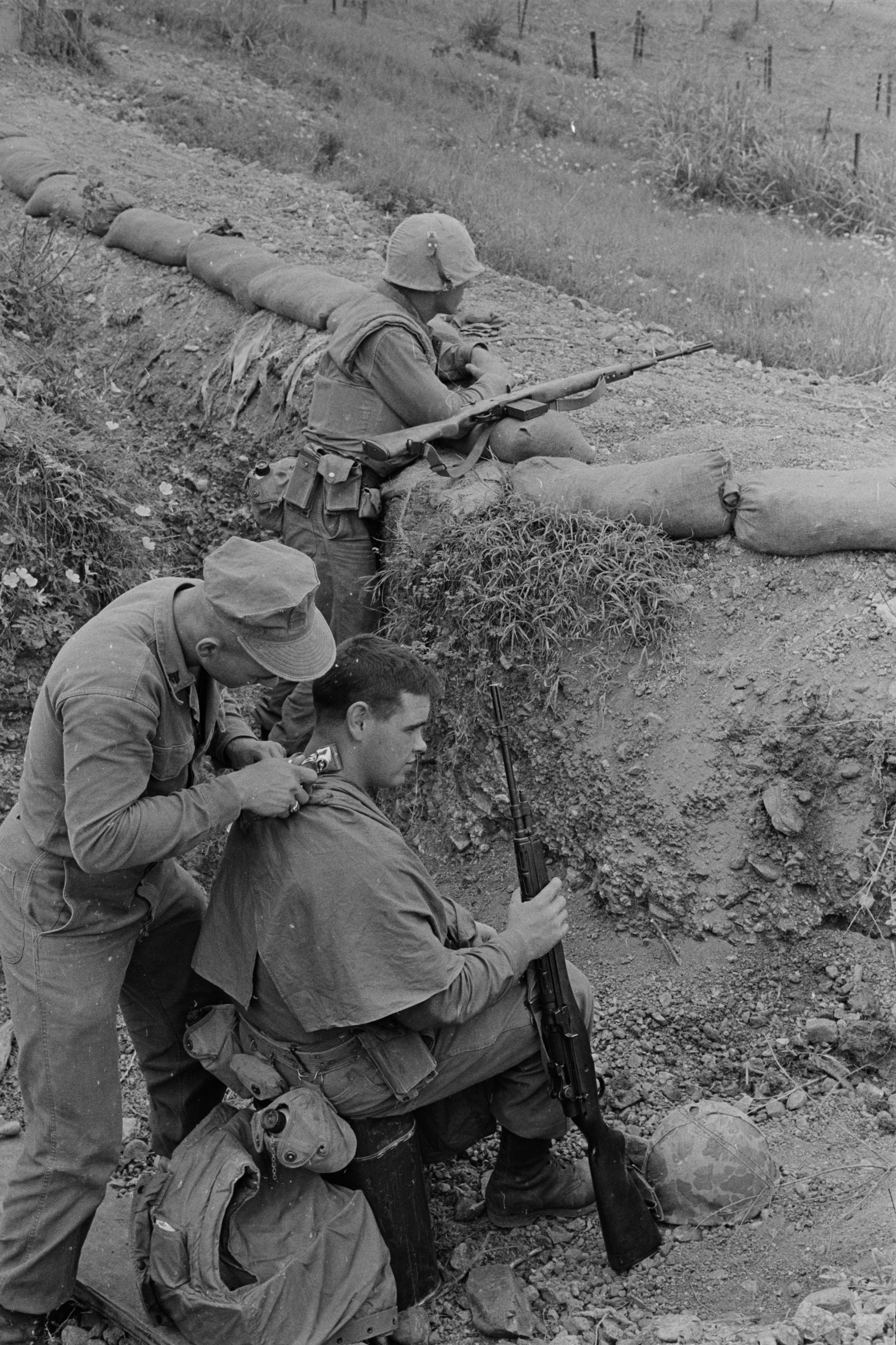
Two soldiers with M14s at Guantanamo Bay Naval Base in 1962

After the M14's adoption, Springfield Armory began tooling a new production line in 1958, delivering the first service rifles to the U.S. Army in July 1959. Long production delays resulted in the 101st Airborne Division being the only unit in the army fully equipped with the M14 by the end of 1960. The Fleet Marine Force completed the change from M1s to M14s in late 1961. Springfield Armory records reflect that M14 manufacture ended as TRW, fulfilling its second contract, delivered its final production increment in the fiscal year 1965 (1 July 1964 – 30 June 1965). The Springfield archive indicates the 1.38 million rifles were acquired for just over $143 million, for a unit cost of about $104.

The M14 was developed to replace four different weapons: the M1 Garand, the M3 submachine gun, the M1 carbine, and the M1918 Browning automatic rifle (BAR). The intention was to simplify the logistical requirements of the troops by limiting the types of ammunition and parts needed to be supplied. Replacing all these weapons with a single weapon system proved to be an impossible task. The M14 was deemed "completely inferior" to even the World War II M1 Garand in a September 1962 report by the comptroller for the U.S. Department of Defense.

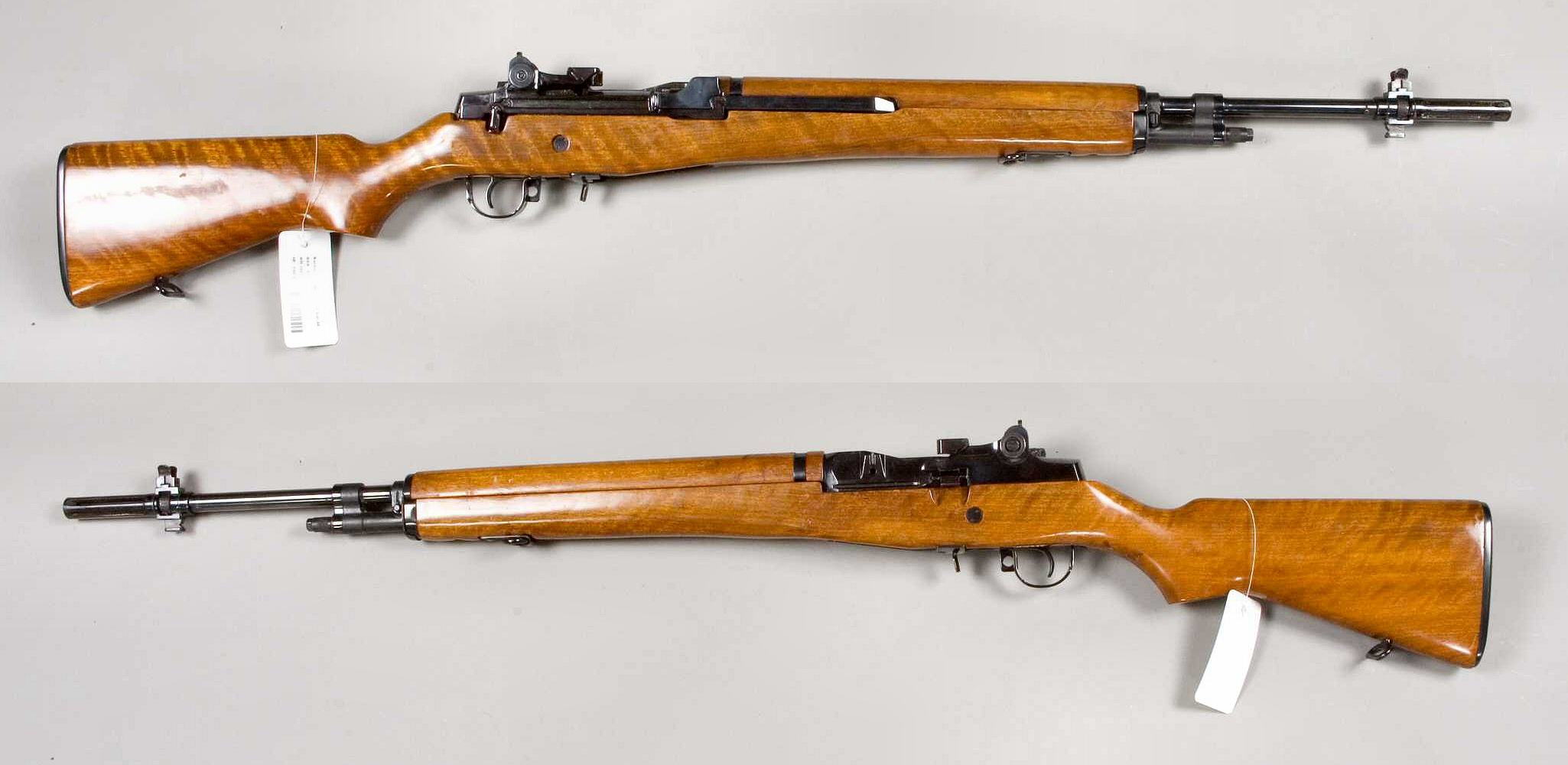
A rare M14 presentation model, serial number 0010

The rifle was unwieldy in the thick brush of Vietnam due to its length and weight, and the traditional wood stocks made of walnut and birch tended to swell and expand in the heavy moisture of the jungle, adversely affecting accuracy. Fiberglass stocks were produced to resolve this problem, but the rifle was discontinued before the fiberglass stocks could be distributed for field use. With 2,560 ft·lbf (3,463 J) of muzzle energy, the power of the 7.62×51mm NATO cartridge was valued for its range and cover penetration; despite this, the power of the cartridge also caused the weapon to be virtually uncontrollable in fully automatic fire. As a result, most M14s were permanently set to semiautomatic fire only, to avoid wasting ammunition in combat.

=== Replacement ===
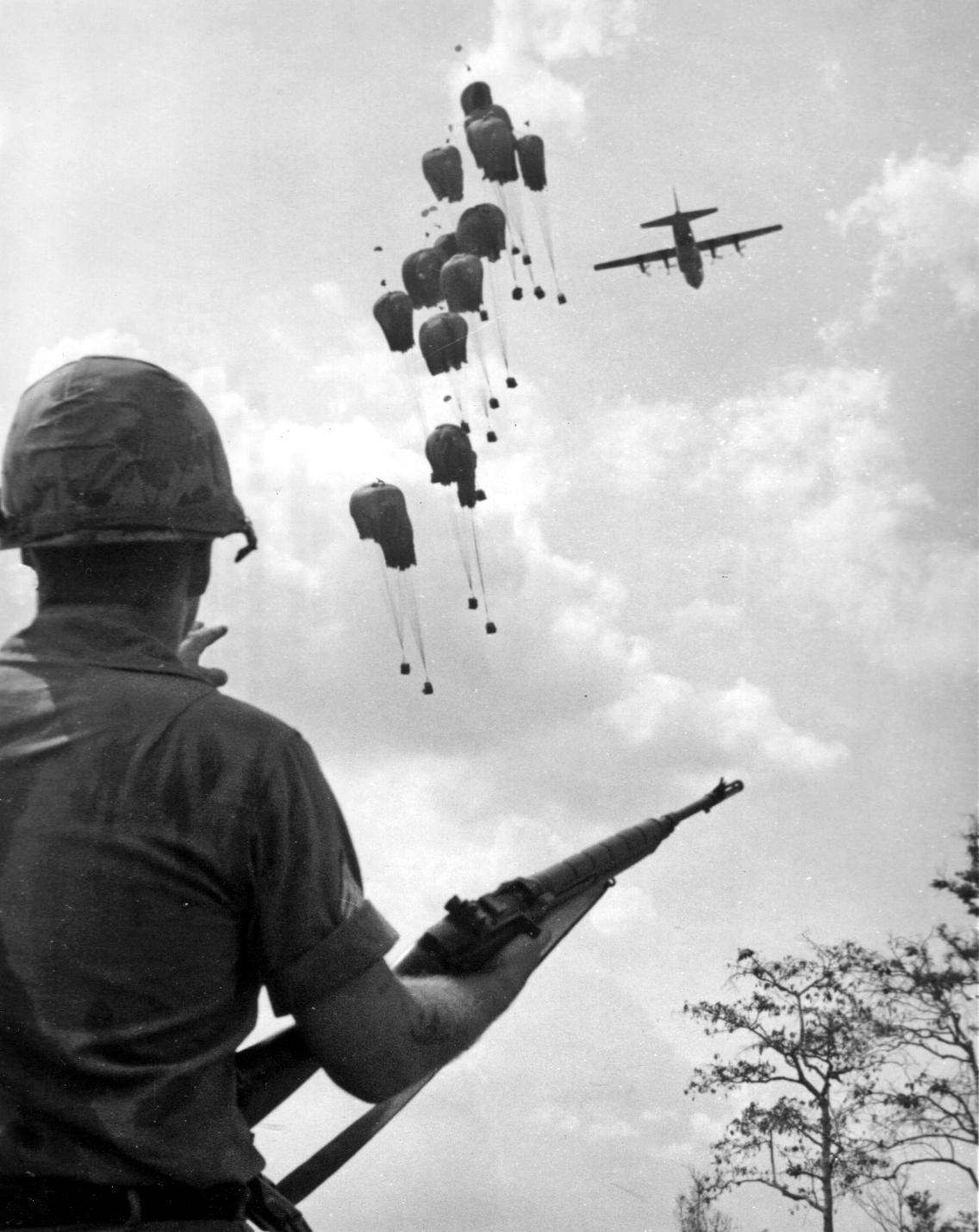
A U.S. soldier with an M14 watches as supplies are dropped in 1967 during the Vietnam War.

Within the Army research and development community, disputes arose between factions that supported the adoption of the M14 and the 7.62×51mm round from their inception and the other factions that opposed them. The M14 remained the primary infantry rifle in Vietnam until it was replaced by the M16 between 1966 and 1967, though combat engineer units kept them for several years longer. Further procurement of the M14 was abruptly halted in early 1968 due to a U.S. Department of Defense report which stated that the AR-15, which would soon be designated the M16, was superior to the M14. A series of tests by the U.S. Department of the Army following the report resulted in the decision to cancel the M14, although the DOD did not cancel the previous FY 1963 orders to be delivered.

In 1964, the M16 was ordered as a replacement for the M14 by the direction of Secretary of Defense Robert McNamara, over the objection of the U.S. Army officers who had backed the M14. Though production of the M14 was officially discontinued, some discontented troops managed to persist with them while deriding the early-model M16 as a frail and underpowered "Mattel toy" that was prone to jamming. A Congressional investigation later discovered these characteristics to be the result of intentional attempts by Army bureaucracy to sabotage the M16's field performance in Vietnam. In late 1967, the U.S. Army designated the M16 as the "Standard A" rifle, and the M14 became a "Limited Standard" weapon. The M14 rifle remained the standard rifle for U.S. Army Basic Training and troops stationed in Europe until 1970.

The U.S. Army converted several thousand M14s into M21 sniper rifles, which remained standard issue for this purpose until the adoption of the M24 SWS in 1988.

In 1969, tooling for the M14 was sold to Taiwan, and many rifles were exported later to Baltic countries and Israel.

=== Post-1970 U.S. military service ===
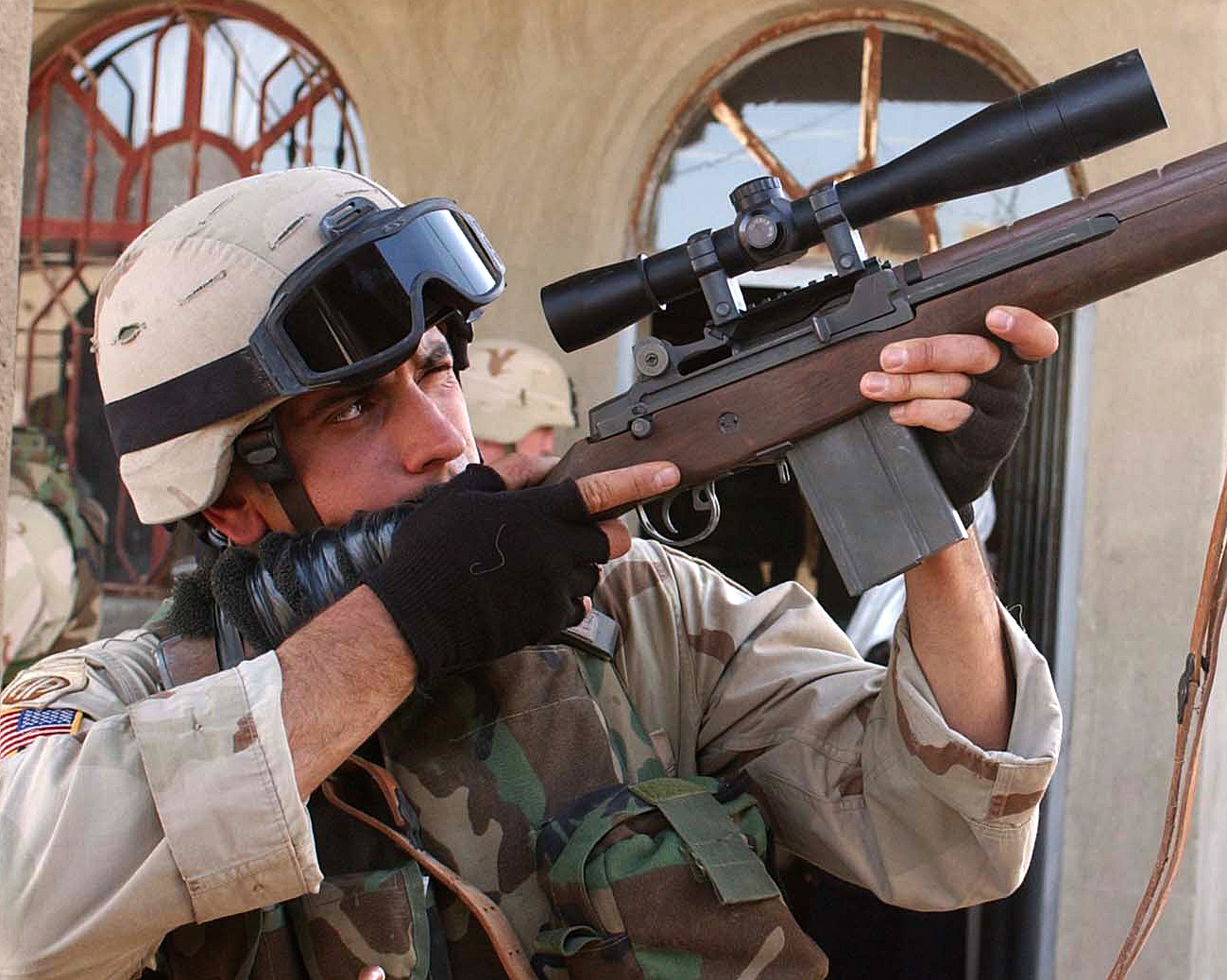
An Army marksman in Fallujah, Iraq, using an M14 with a Leupold LR/T 10×40 mm M3 scope

Although the M14 was phased out as the standard-issue rifle by 1970, M14 variants are still used by branches of the U.S. military, as well as other armed forces, especially as a sniper rifle and as a designated marksman rifle (DMR), due to its accuracy and effectiveness at long range. In 1989, the Marine Corps began a program to upgrade their M14s into DMRs. The final product created by the Precision Weapons Section in Marine Corps Base Quantico was called the Marine Corps DMR and was intended for use by security teams (Special Reaction Team and Fleet Antiterrorism Security Team companies), and Marine scout snipers in the cases where a semiautomatic rifle would be more appropriate than the standard bolt-action M40A1/A3 rifle. The USMC Rifle Team currently uses the M14 in shooting competitions.

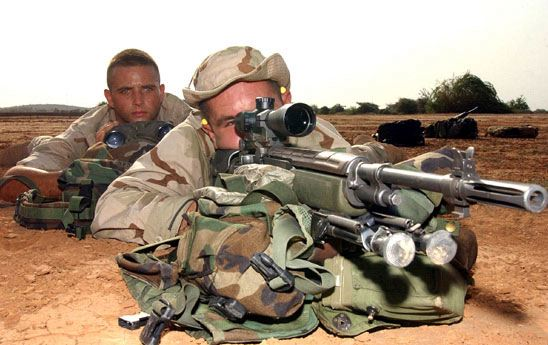
A USMC designated marksman rifle in use

Some original-production M14s, not to be confused with M21 rifles, were in use by the Army until the Afghanistan and Iraq Wars, when they began to be employed as DMRs and sniper rifles. A 2009 study conducted by the Army claimed that half of the engagements in Afghanistan occurred from beyond 300 meters (330 yd). American 5.56×45mm NATO service rifles were ineffective at these ranges, which prompted the reissue of thousands of M14s. Common modifications included scopes, fiberglass stocks, and other accessories.

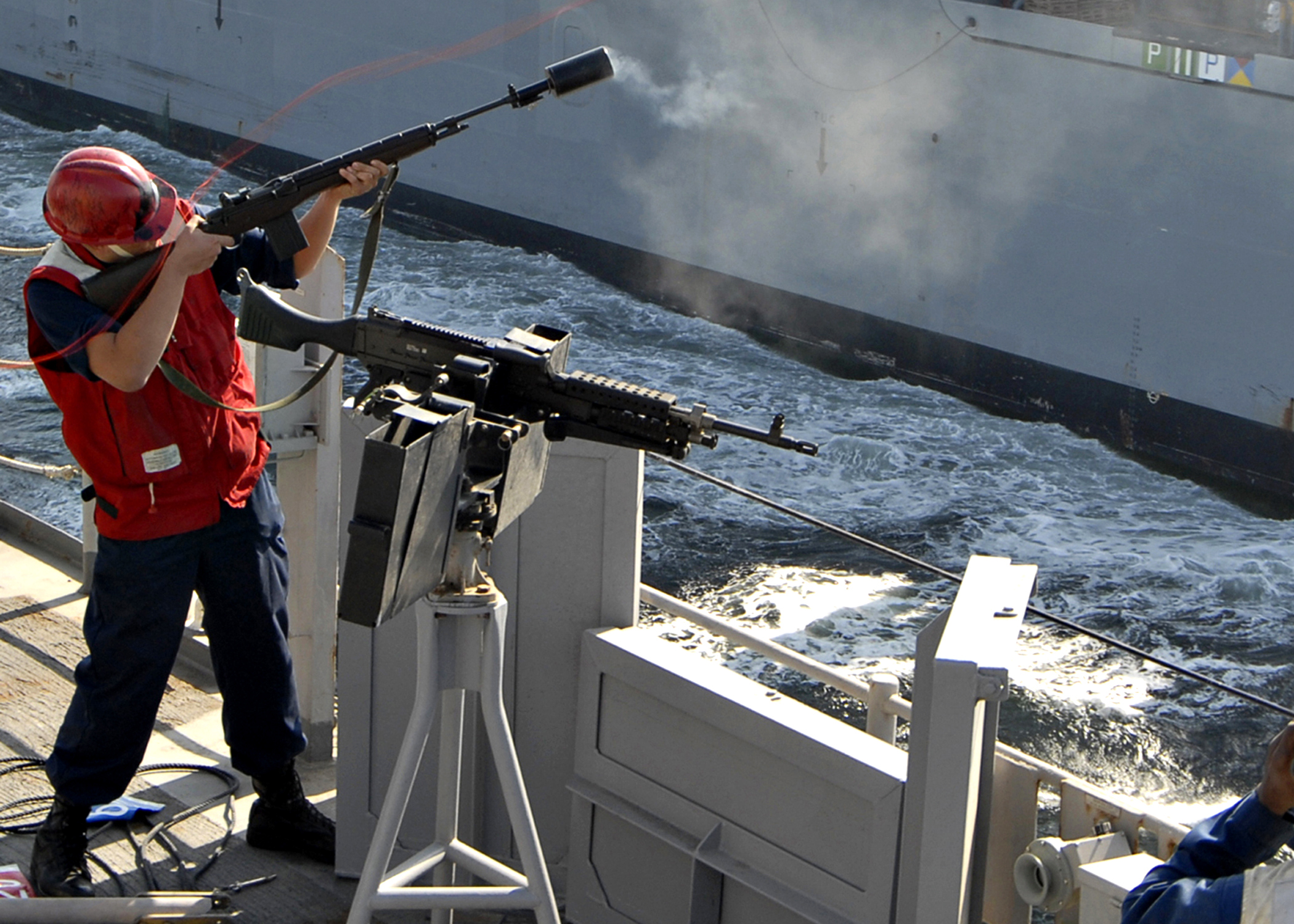
A gunner's mate using an M14 rifle to fire a shot line from the USS Carter Hall to USNS Lewis and Clark

The 1st Battalion of the 3rd United States Infantry Regiment ("The Old Guard") in the Military District of Washington is the sole remaining regular U.S. Army combat field unit where the M14 is still issued as the standard rifle, along with a chromed bayonet and an extra wooden stock with a white sling for military funerals, parades, and other ceremonies. The United States Air Force Honor Guard uses a version of the M14. The U.S. Navy Ceremonial Guard and Base Honor Guards also use the M14 for three-volley salutes in military funerals.

It is the drill and parade rifle of the United States Military Academy, United States Naval Academy, United States Air Force Academy, The Citadel, Norwich University, Virginia Military Institute, and the University of North Georgia. U.S. Navy ships carry several M14s in their armories. They are issued to sailors going on watch out on deck in port, and to backup alert forces. The M14 is also used to shoot a large rubber projectile to another ship when underway to start the lines over for alongside refueling and replenishment.

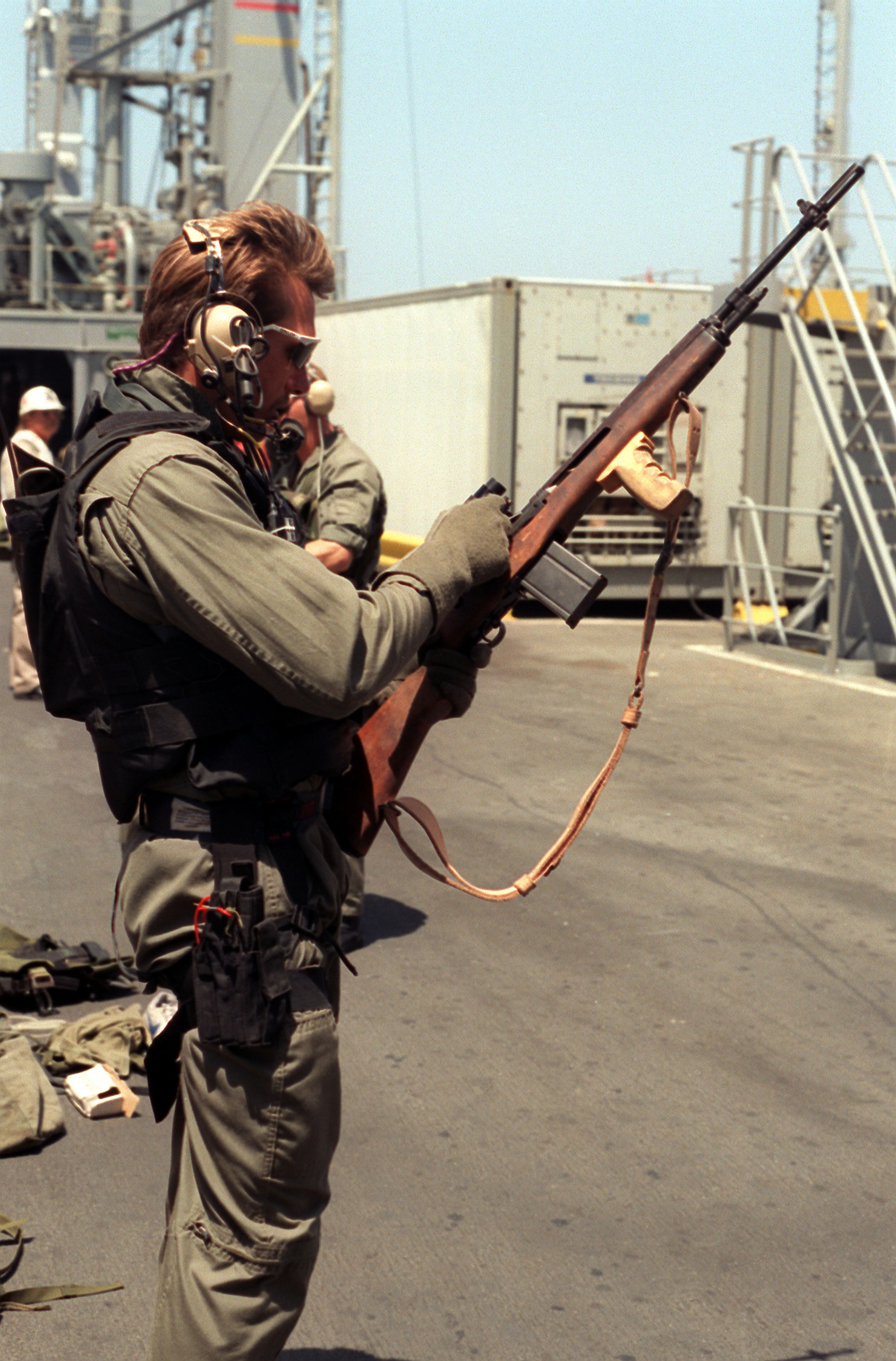
A SEAL operator with an M14 rifle is participating in maritime interdiction enforcement during Operation Desert Storm.

Sniper variants have been used by the United States Navy SEALs. Often mistaken for the M21 in the overt literature, only one of them has received a standard name in the U.S. military designations system: the M25 Sniper Weapon System, developed by the Special Forces. SEALs also use the Mk 14 Mod 0 Enhanced Battle Rifle for battle and in a designated marksman role. "Delta Force" units are known to have used M14 sniper variants. Eric L. Haney indicated in his memoir Inside Delta Force, that every soldier going through the Operator Training Course trained on the M14. According to Black Hawk Down: A Story of Modern War, an account of the Battle of Mogadishu, Sergeant First Class Randy Shughart used an M14 for sniping from helicopters to provide support fire to ground troops.

The U.S. Army Special Forces ("Green Berets") have made some use of the M25 "spotter rifle". The M25 was developed in the late 1980s within the 10th Special Forces Group, which was charged to support Special Forces sniper weapons and the Special Operations Target Interdiction Course (SOTIC). The M25 was first planned as a replacement for the old M21, but after the Army adoption of the M24 SWS as its standard sniper rifle, the M25 was intended to be used by spotters of the sniper teams, while the snipers use the bolt-action M24.

The M14 has remained in service longer than any other U.S. infantry rifle, surpassing the M1903 Springfield rifle, and holds the distinction of serving one of the shortest periods as the standard infantry service rifle of the U.S. Army, only second to the US Springfield Krag–Jørgensen rifles and carbines.

=== International service ===
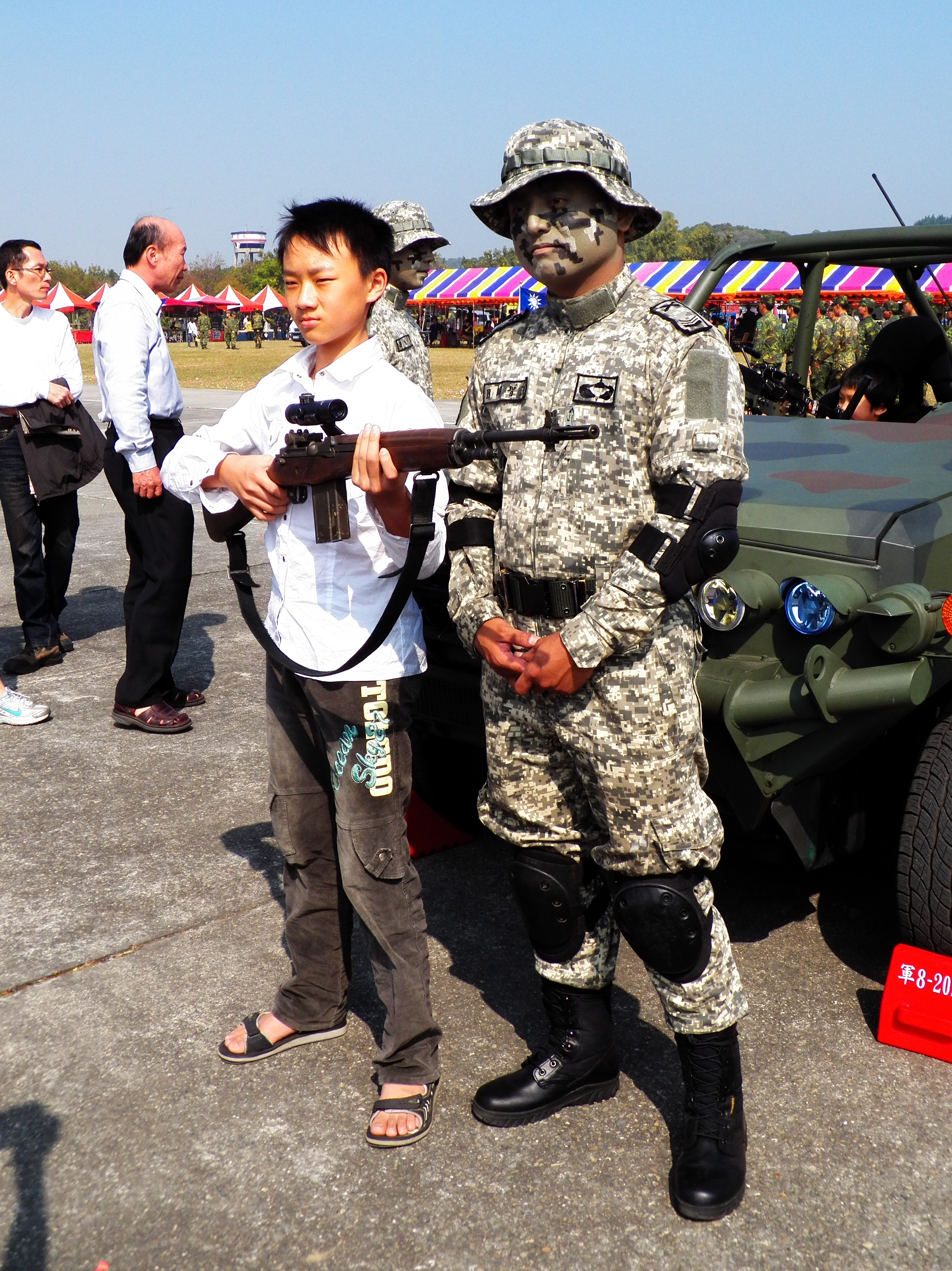
ROCA Special Force Team Leader poses for a photo with a boy and a Type 57

The Philippines issues M14 rifles, M1/M2 carbines, M1 rifles, and M16 rifles, to their civilian defense forces and various cadet corps service academies. The Hellenic Navy uses the M14.

In 1967, the Springfield tooling and assembly line for M14 production was sold to the Republic of China, also known as Taiwan. In 1968, the State Arsenal of the Republic of China began producing the Type 57 rifle, and from 1969 to the present, produced over 1 million Type 57 rifles. The Type 57 is currently in service with airport guards and the reserves.

== Rifle design ==
=== Receiver markings ===
Stamped into receiver heel:

- U.S. Rifle
- 7.62-MM M14
- Springfield Armory (or commercial contractor name)
- Serial number

=== Stock ===
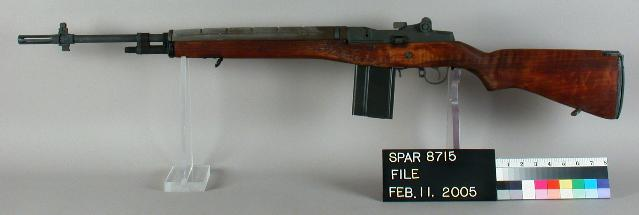
M14 with magazine

The M14 rifle was first furnished with a walnut stock, then with birch, and finally with a synthetic fiberglass stock due to the moisture in the humid jungle environments of rural Vietnam causing wood to swell. The stock was fitted with a hinged shoulder rest for improved user comfort when firing from a prone position. Original-equipment walnut and birch stocks carry the Department of Defense acceptance stamp or cartouche, consisting of an arc of three stars above a spread-winged eagle. After successful test firing, a proof stamp was also applied to these stocks consisting of a letter "P" within a circle.

Rifles manufactured through late 1960 were provided with walnut handguards. Synthetic, slot-ventilated handguards were produced, but proved to be too fragile for military use. These were replaced by a solid synthetic handguard that is still in use, usually colored in dark brown, black, or a camouflage pattern.

=== Rifling ===
Standard M14 rifling has a right-hand 1:12-inch twist with 4 grooves.

=== Accessories ===
Although M14 rifle production ended in 1964, the limited standard status of the weapon resulted in the continued manufacture of accessories and spare parts into the late 1960s and beyond.

- M6 bayonet with M8A1 sheath
- M2 Bandoleer (has six pockets, each containing two 5-round Mauser-type clips for a total of 60 rounds, and a pouch for a magazine filler. The sling was adjustable and was held in place with a matte-black steel safety pin). Standard operating procedure was for the operator to use up the ammunition in the bandoleers before using the loaded magazines in the ammo pouches. The seam stitching of each pocket could be ripped out to allow the bandoleer to carry six loaded 20-round magazines.
- Sling: The service rifle used a one-piece cotton or nylon webbing sling, and the competition and sniping variants use the standard M1907 two-piece leather sling.
- Cleaning kit, contained in the stock's butt-trap, included a combination tool, ratchet chamber brush, plastic lubricant case, brass bore brush, four cleaning rod sections, cleaning rod case, and a cleaning rod patch-holding tip.
- M5 winter trigger and winter safety
- M12 blank firing attachment and M3 breech shield
- Cartridge charger clip (holds five cartridges)
- Magazine filler (or "spoon") for charging detached magazines externally: The M14 has a groove over the action that allows the operator to place a loaded clip and top off the attached magazine internally through the open action.
- M1956 Universal Small Arms Ammunition Pouch, First Pattern could hold two 20-round M14 magazines horizontally.
- M1956 Universal Small Arms Ammunition Pouch, Second Pattern could hold three 20-round M14 magazines vertically.
- M1961 ammunition magazine pouch could carry one 20-round M14 magazine. The bottom of the pouch contained eyelets for attaching a first aid pouch or three-cell (six pockets) grenade carrier that could be tied down around the thigh.
- M2 bipod
- M76 rifle grenade launcher
- M15 grenade launcher sight
- Mk 87 Mod 0/1 line throwing kit

=== Types of sights ===
- Rear peep, front blade, metric
- Rear National Match peep with hood, front National Match blade, metric
- Front sights located on the muzzle

== Variants and related designs ==
=== Military ===
==== M15 ====
The M15 Squad Automatic Weapon was a modified M14 developed as a replacement for the M1918 Browning Automatic Rifle for use as a squad automatic weapon. As with the M14, the M15 was chambered for 7.62×51mm NATO, a lighter cartridge than the BAR's chambering of .30-06. It featured a heavier barrel and stock, two pistol grips (one fixed, one folding), a hinged butt plate, a selector switch for fully automatic fire, a bipod, and used the standard BAR sling.

Firing tests showed that the M14, when equipped with the selector switch, hinged butt plate and bipod, performed as well as the M15. As a result, the M15 was dropped and the modified M14 became the squad automatic weapon. Accuracy and control problems with this variant led to the addition of a pistol grip, a folding rubber-covered metal foregrip and a muzzle stabilizer. Despite these modifications, it remained a poor suppressive fire weapon owing to its 20-round magazines and a tendency to rapidly overheat.

==== M14E1 ====
The M14E1 was tested with a variety of folding stocks to provide better maneuverability for armored infantry, paratroopers and others. No variant was standardized.

==== M14E2/M14A1 ====
Selective fire version of the standard M14 used as a squad automatic weapon. Successor to the full-automatic M14 with a bipod and the never-issued M15. The developmental model was known as the M14E2. The model concept was developed by the United States Army Infantry School. The variant was known as the M14 (USAIB), after the initialism for "United States Army Infantry Board". The variant was issued in 1963 and redesignated as M14A1 in 1966.

It had a full pistol-gripped in-line stock to control recoil, a plastic upper forend to save weight, a muzzle compensator, the BAR sling, an M2 bipod, a folding metal vertical foregrip mounted under the forend of the stock, and a rubber recoil shoulder pad under the hinged butt plate. Although an improvement over the M14 when in full-auto, it was still difficult to control, overheated rapidly, and the 20-round magazine limited its ability to deliver suppressive fire.

==== M14M (Modified)/M14NM (National Match) ====
The M14M is a semi-automatic only version of the standard M14 that was developed for use in civilian rifle marksmanship activities such as the Civilian Marksmanship Program. M14M rifles were converted from existing M14 rifles by welding the select-fire mechanism to prevent full-automatic firing. The M14NM (National Match) is an M14M rifle built to National Match accuracy standards.

The M14M and M14NM rifles are described in a now-obsolete Army regulation, AR 920–25, "Rifles, M14M and M14NM, For Civilian Marksmanship Use", 8 February 1965. Paragraph 2 stated that the Director of the Alcohol and Tobacco Tax Division, Internal Revenue Service, Department of the Treasury (predecessor to the Bureau of Alcohol, Tobacco, Firearms, and Explosives) had ruled that M14M and M14NM rifles so modified would not be subject to the 1934 National Firearms Act (NFA) and, as such, could be sold or issued to civilians. Three years later, with the passage of the Gun Control Act of 1968, the NFA was amended to prohibit the sale of previously modified automatic weapons such as the M14M and M14NM to civilians.

==== M14 SMUD ====
Stand-off Munition Disruption, used by Explosive Ordnance Disposal personnel to destroy unexploded ordnance. Essentially an M14 National Match rifle with a scope.

==== Mk 14 EBR ====
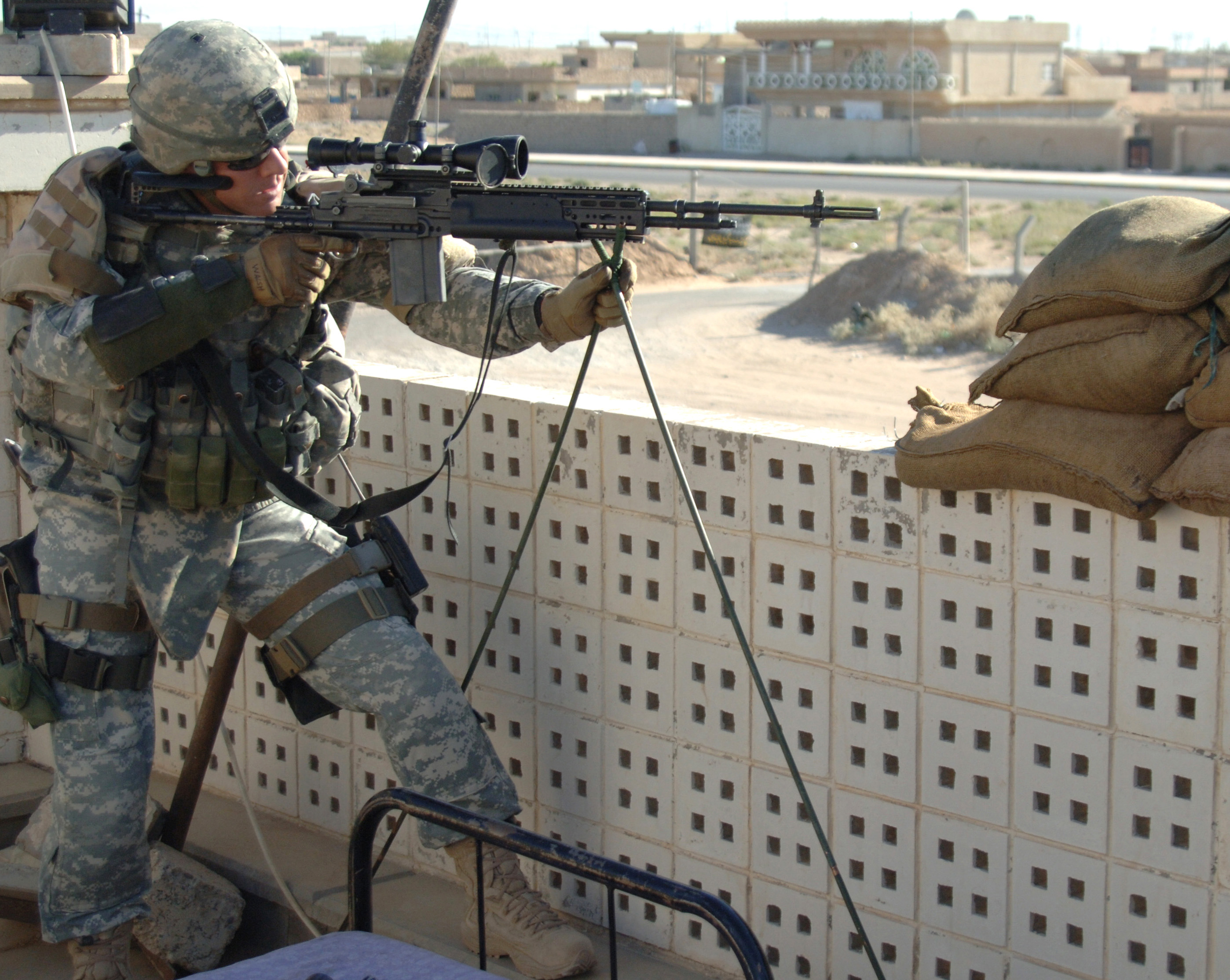
A soldier using a Mk 14 EBR-RI, equipped with a Sage M14ALCS chassis stock, provides overwatch security in Iraq, 2006.

The Mk 14 Enhanced Battle Rifle is a more tactical version of the M14, with a Sage International EBR chassis, adapting multiple rails for more accessories.

==== M14 Tactical ====
Modified M14 using the same stock as the Mk 14 but with a 22-inch barrel and a Smith Enterprise muzzle brake, used by the United States Coast Guard.

==== M14 Designated Marksman Rifle ====
Designated marksman rifle (DMR) version of the M14, used by the United States Marine Corps; replaced by the M39 Enhanced Marksman Rifle.

==== M39 Enhanced Marksman Rifle ====
Modified M14 DMR fitted with the same stock as Mk 14, used by the United States Marine Corps; being replaced by the M110 Semi-Automatic Sniper System.

==== M89SR Model 89 Sniper Rifle ====
The M89SR is an M14 in bullpup configuration first introduced by Sardius in the 1980s. Later produced by Technical Equipment International (TEI) for the Israel Defense Forces.

==== AWC G2A Sniper Rifle ====
The AWC G2A is a modified M14 with bullpup stock designed by Lynn McWilliams and Gale McMillian in the late 1990s. Produced and delivered for testing at the Fort Bragg sniper school. They consist of the G2, G2A and G2FA models.

==== M21 and M25 sniper rifles ====
The M21 and M25 are accurized sniper models of the M14, assembled with more care and precision than is standard.

==== GA SOCOM-16 M14 Designated Marksman Rifle (DMR) ====
Refurbished and upgraded M14 rifle by Philippines' Government Arsenal GA SOCOM-16 model, very similar to the Springfield Armory M1A SOCOM 16 rifle. Uses a 16" barrel specified for Special Operations Command units' requirement, as compared to standard M14 which uses the original 22" barrel, and EBR which uses an 18" barrel.

==== M14 (Modified for CMP) ====
In July 2026, the Civilian Marksmanship Program announced the availability of surplus M14 rifles "modified to be permanently and irreversibly semi-automatic rifles" for sale in "late 2026 to early 2027" to U.S. citizens that are members of a CMP-affiliated club.

=== Commercial production ===
==== Federal Ordnance ====
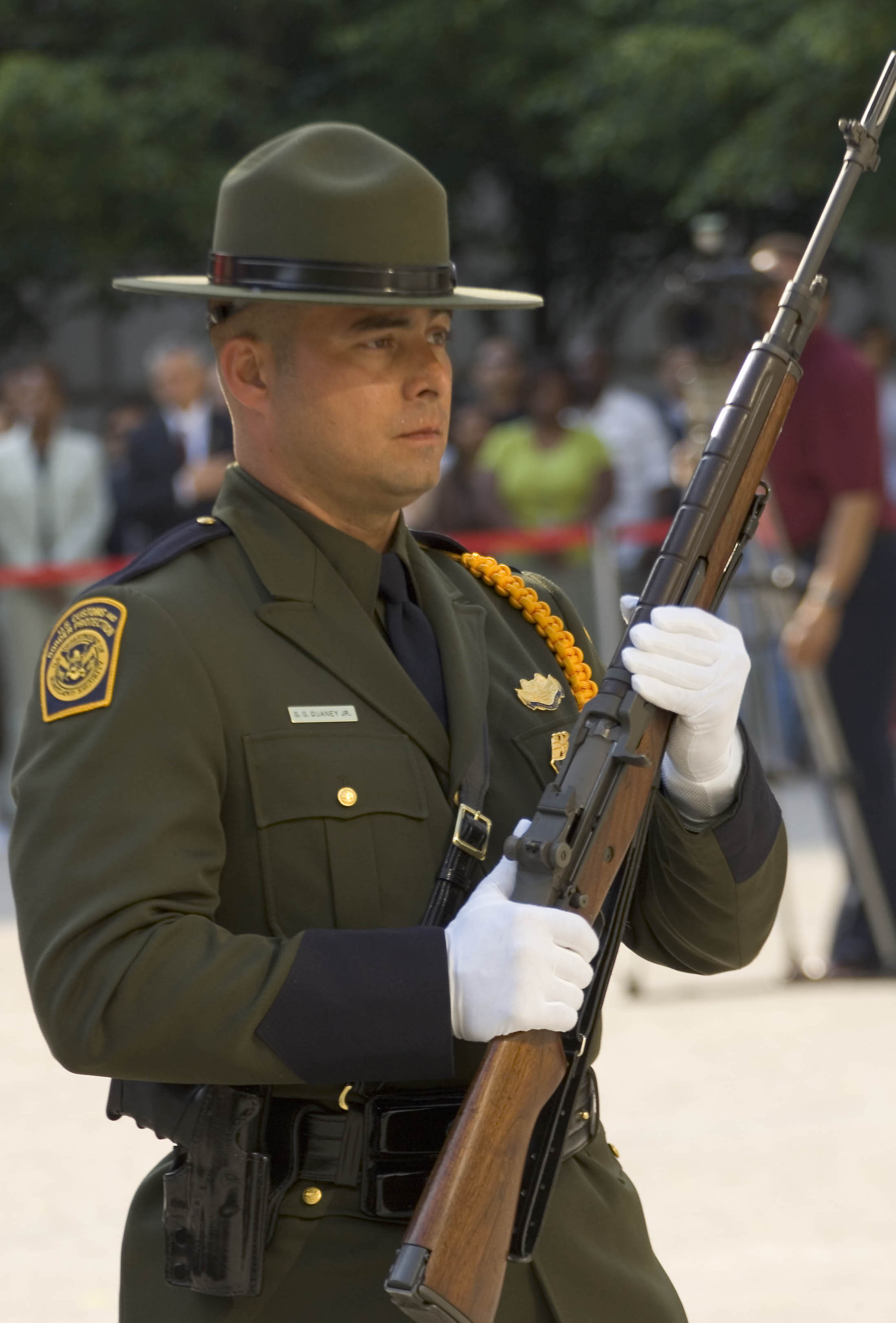
A U.S. Border Patrol Agent with M14 during a law enforcement memorial service

From 1984 to 1991, Federal Ordnance of South El Monte, California, sold a semi-automatic version of the M14 rifle. Initially named the M14 or M14A, the rifle used an aftermarket semi-automatic receiver fitted with surplus USGI M14 parts. All receivers were machined from castings of AISI 8620 alloy steel. Except for the first 50 receivers, the castings were supplied by Electro Crisol Metal, S.A., of Santander, Spain, then imported to the US for heat treatment, finish machining, and exterior phosphate treatment. M14 and M14A receivers were heat-treated using the carburizing process by a firm in Santa Ana, California, followed by finish machining on a CNC machine at Federal Ordnance in South El Monte.

Federal Ordnance M14 and M14A receivers were heat-treated and carburized according to USGI M14 requirements. Each completed production rifle was proof fired, then tested for functioning by firing three rounds. USGI parts and bolts were used extensively in Federal Ordnance rifles through at least serial number 88XX. In 1989, Federal Ordnance renamed the rifle the M14SA and M14CSA. Rifles in the 93XX serial range and higher have modified receivers designed to accept Chinese-made bolts, barrels, and other parts owing to a shortage of original USGI components. About 51,000 complete Federal Ordnance M14 rifles and 60,000 or more receivers were manufactured before production was halted in late 1991.

==== Norinco ====
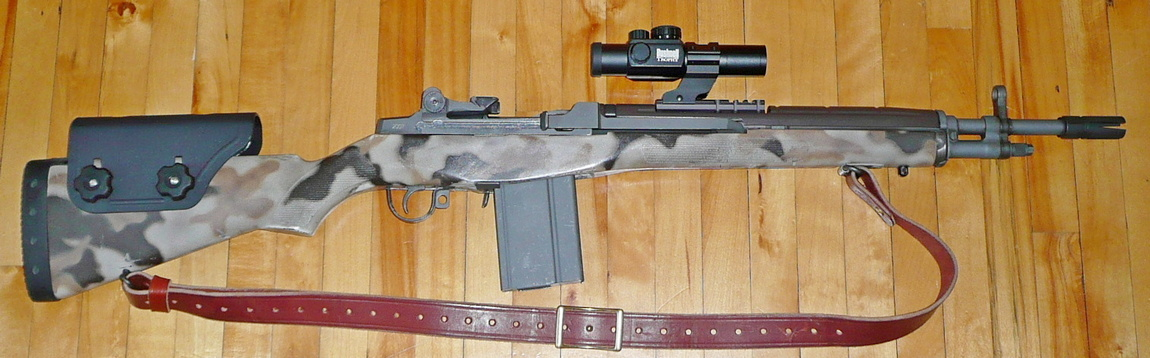
Norinco M14s Custom with a Bushnell red dot sight

Norinco manufactures versions of the M14 rifle known as the M14S (Sporter) and the M305. Chinese copies of the select-fire and semi-automatic versions of the M14 were also made by Norinco, supposedly from M14s captured in the Vietnam War from American/allied troops.

The two versions of the M305 are M305A/B, one with the same barrel as the regular M14 and one with a short barrel. The M305A is an M14 chambered to fire 7.62x39 ammo. and the M305B is an M14 with an 18.5-inch barrel and chambered to fire in 7.62 NATO caliber.

These rifles were banned from U.S. importation in 1994 due to a ban under the Violent Crime Control and Law Enforcement Act. They were commonly sold and were popular in Canada for hunting and target shooting until they were reclassified as prohibited firearms on May 1, 2020.

Production of these M14s were contracted out to Yunnan Xiyi Industry Company Limited or State Arsenal 356 from the rifles to the 7.62 mm NATO magazines.

==== Poly Technologies ("Polytech") ====
Poly Technologies also produced an unlicensed version of the M14 rifle known as the M14/S. They were made in semi-auto mode only. As with the Norinco rifles, manufacture was subcontracted to State Arsenal 356.

All Polytech rifles were banned in the 1989 firearm importation ban by the President George H.W. Bush administration.

==== Smith Enterprise, Inc. ====
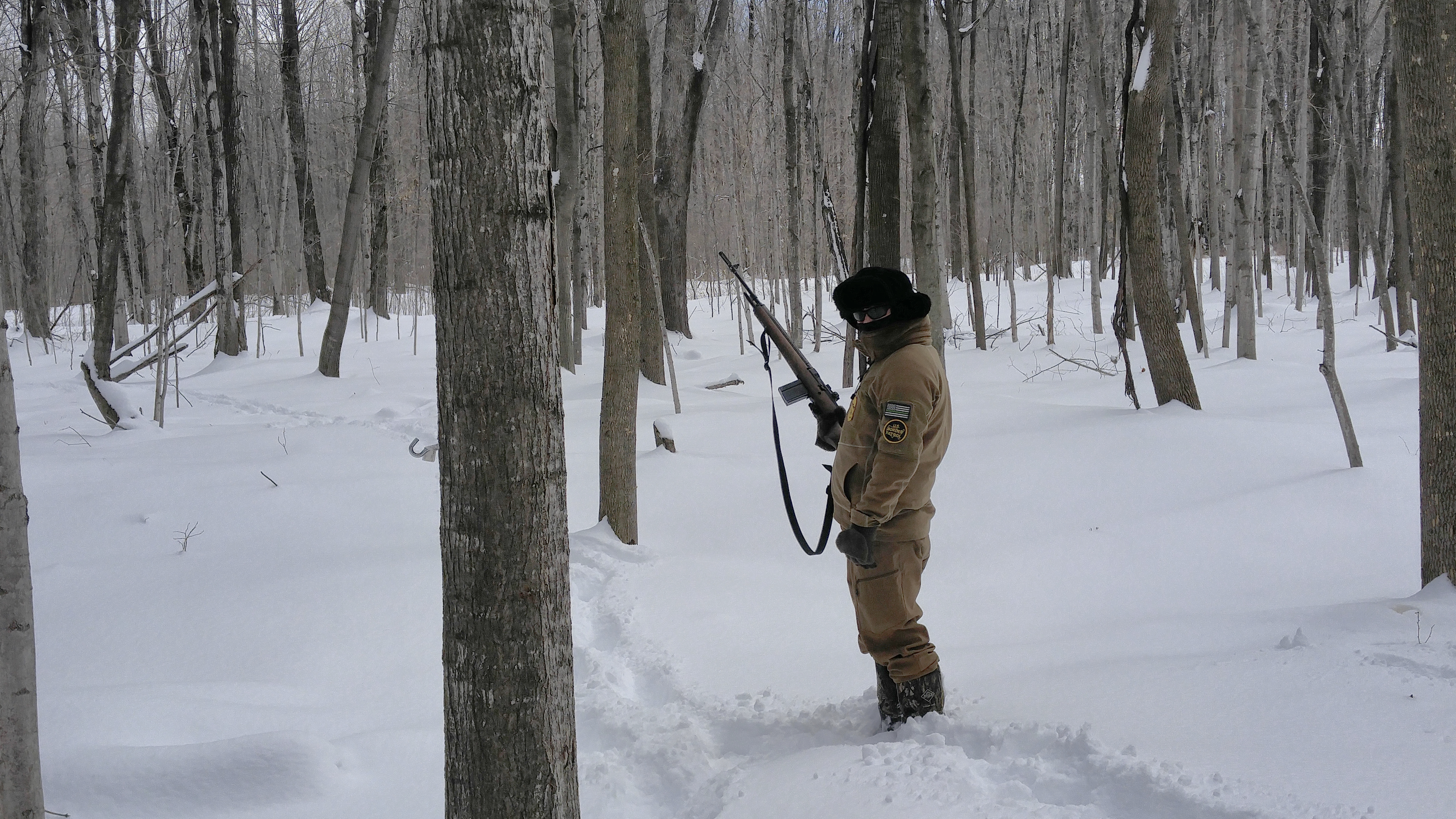
A U.S. Border Patrol agent with an M14 rifle on the Canadian border in 2017

Smith Enterprise Inc. was founded as Western Ordnance in 1979 by Richard Smith in Mesa, Arizona, and the company made numerous types of rifles, but specialized in the M1 Garand and M14. In 1993, Western Ordnance reformed as Smith Enterprise and has built and rebuilt numerous M14 rifles for the US military and the militaries of Colombia, Canada, and other nations.

The U.S. Department of Defense contracted with Smith Enterprise to build and modify M14 rifles for use by soldiers, marines, and sailors in Iraq and Afghanistan. Smith Enterprise played a major part in the M14 rifle modernization projects for various US military units, which resulted in the development of the U.S. Navy Mark 14 enhanced battle rifle (EBR). The company's history included originally making forged receivers for M14 rifles and briefly switching to investment casting. Smith stopped making receivers for a few years, but re-entered the market with receivers machined from bar stock in 2002.

In 2003, Smith Enterprise Inc. created its version of the M14 EBR known as the Mk14 Mod 0, type SEI. The rifle used a medium heavy-weight 18-inch barrel and was used as a basis to create the US Navy's Mark 14 Mod 0, with Springfield Armory, Inc. being asked to supply the necessary machinery in cooperation with the Naval Surface Warfare Center Crane Division. SEI builds an improved M14 gas cylinder as a component of their specialized rifles and for the military to upgrade older rifles. The gas cylinder is assigned the NATO stock number: NSN 1005-00-790-8766.

==== Springfield Armory, Inc. ====
Springfield Armory, Inc. of Geneseo, Illinois, produces a semi-automatic only version of the M14 known as the M1A. The company produces several variations of the basic rifle with different stocks, barrel weights, barrel lengths, and other optional features. The Springfield M1A and its model variants have been widely distributed in the U.S. civilian market and have seen use by various law-enforcement agencies in the U.S.

Springfield Armory, Inc. also produces the SOCOM series and the Scout Squad Rifle, based on the short-barreled version of the M14. The SOCOM 16 comes with provisions to mount a red dot sight and the SOCOM II adds railed handguards to the package.

== Gallery ==
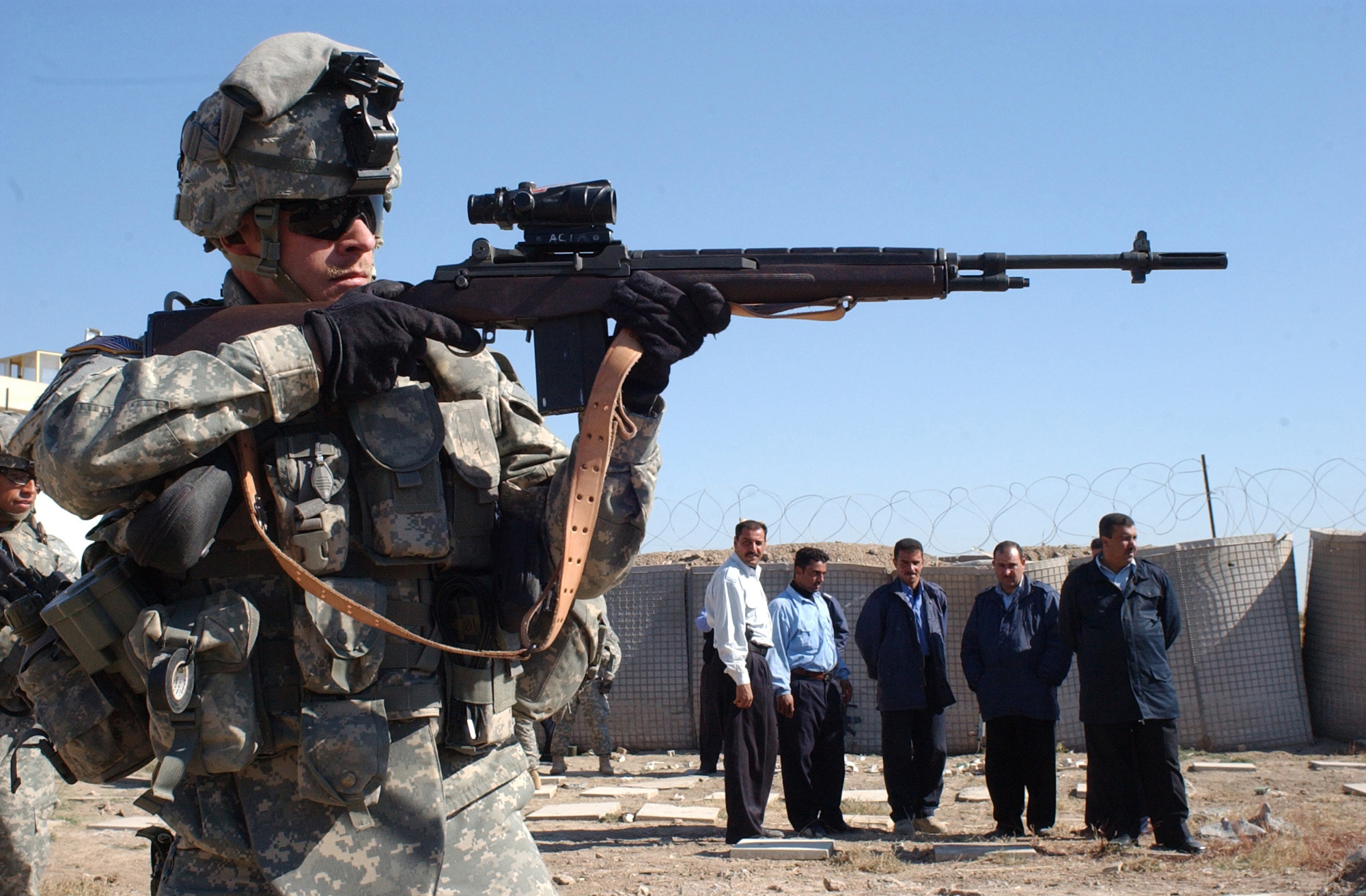
A U.S. soldier demonstrates shooting an M14 rifle to Iraqi Highway Patrol (IHP) police officers during training in Iraq, 2006.

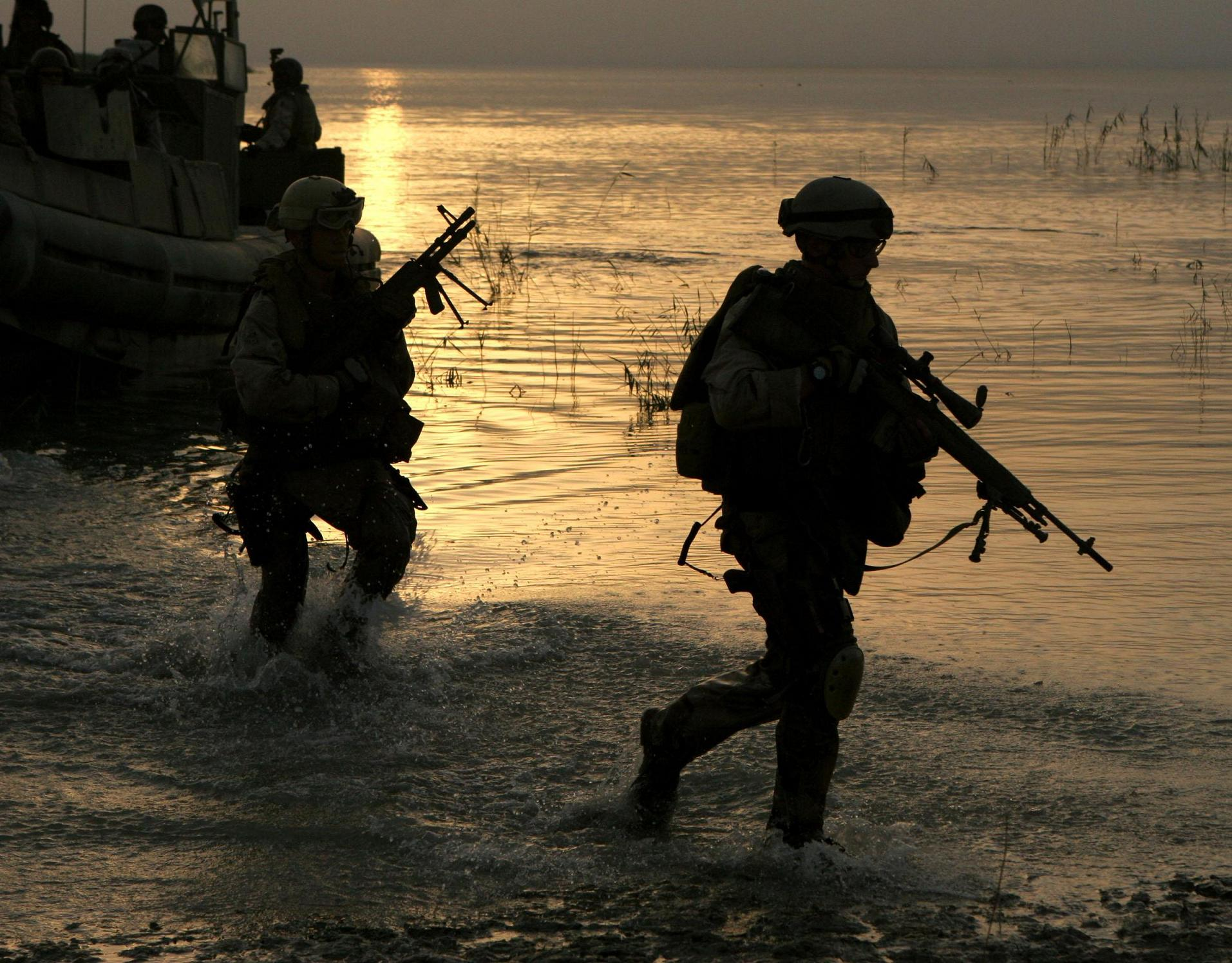
Members of the 13th Marine Expeditionary Unit, enter the reeds on the edge of Lake Tharthar in Iraq to conduct cordon and search operations July 15, 2007.

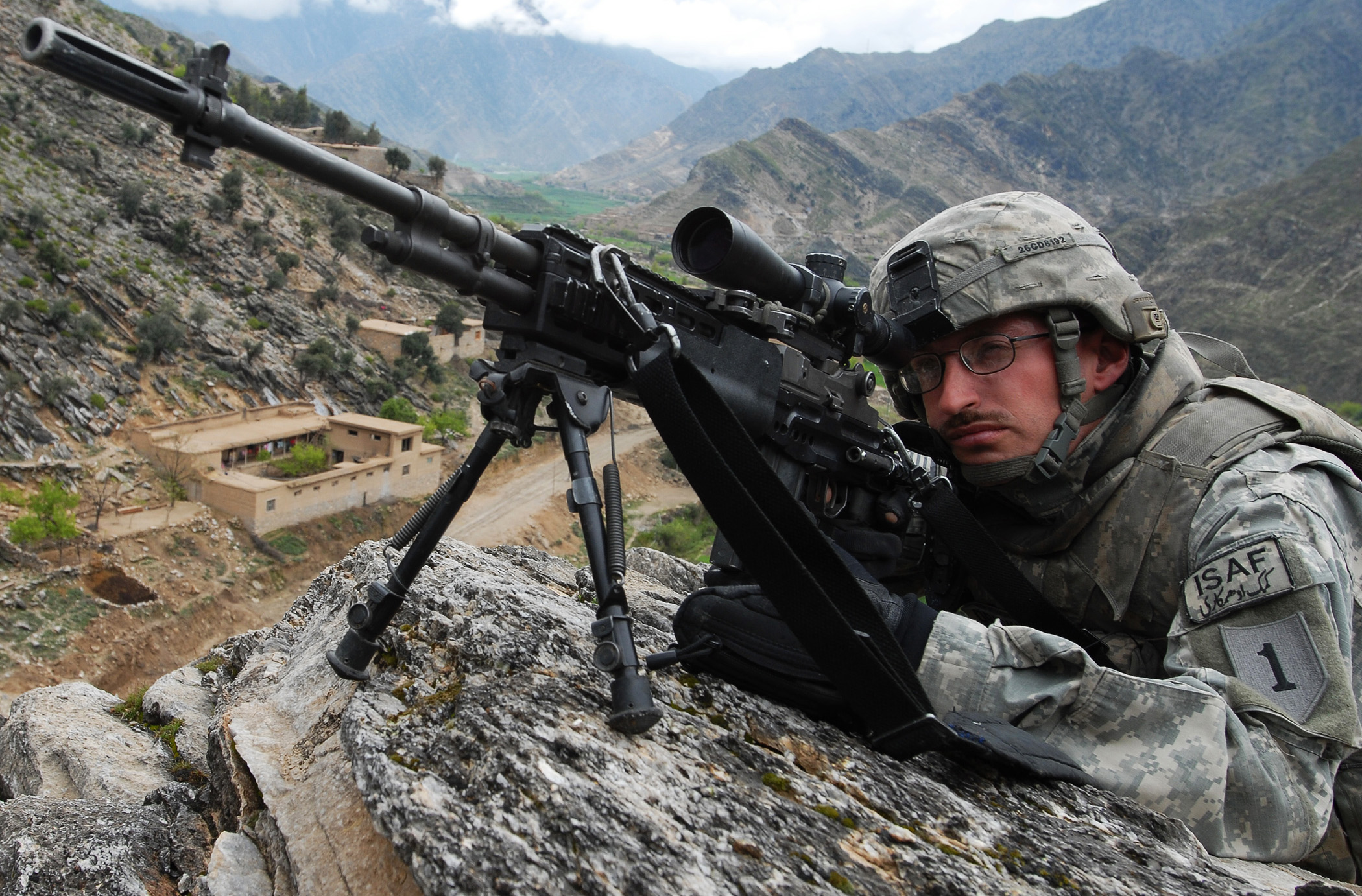
A U.S. soldier scans for activity during a combat patrol in Afghanistan, 2009.

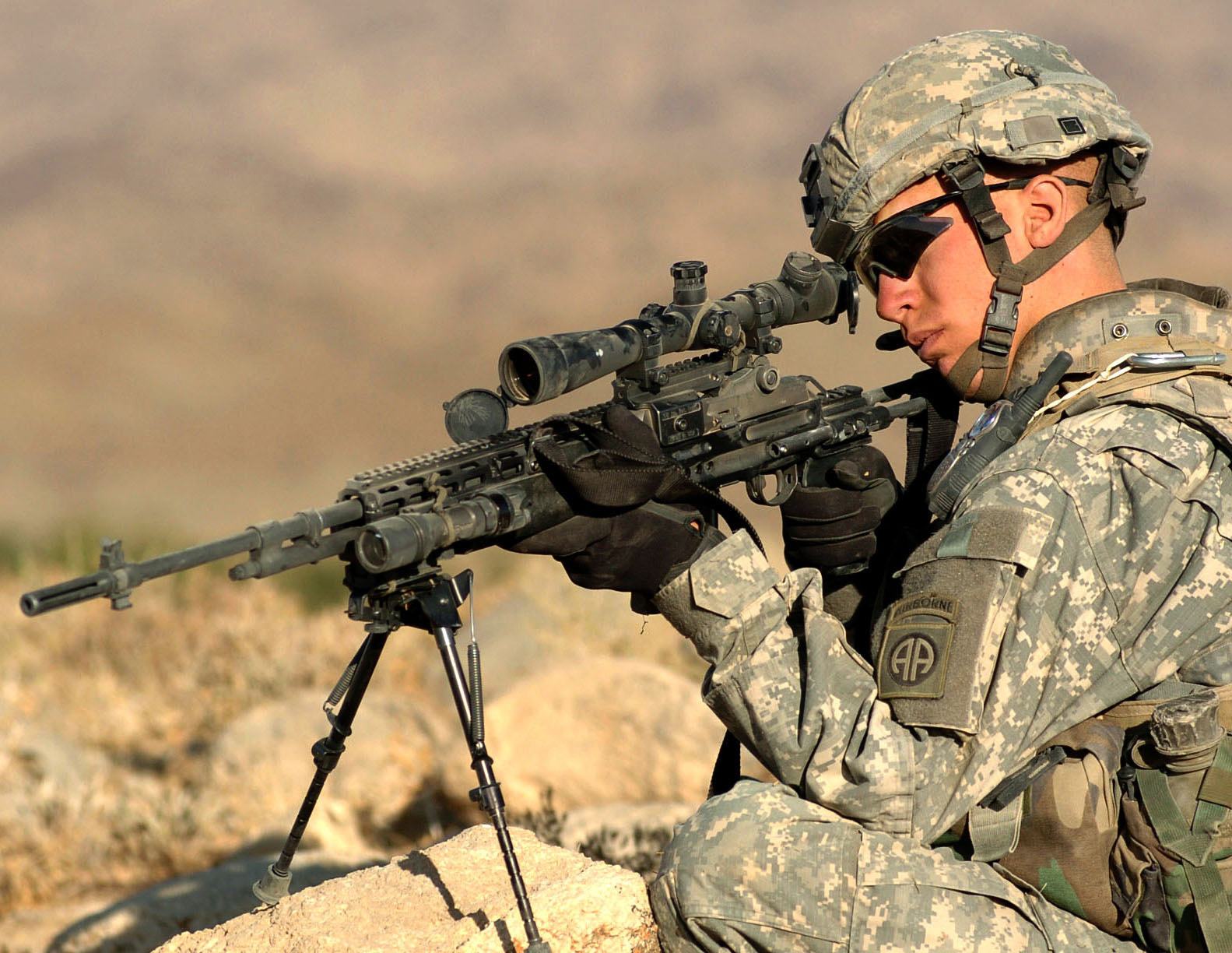
A soldier with an M14 equipped with a Sage M14ALCS chassis stock.

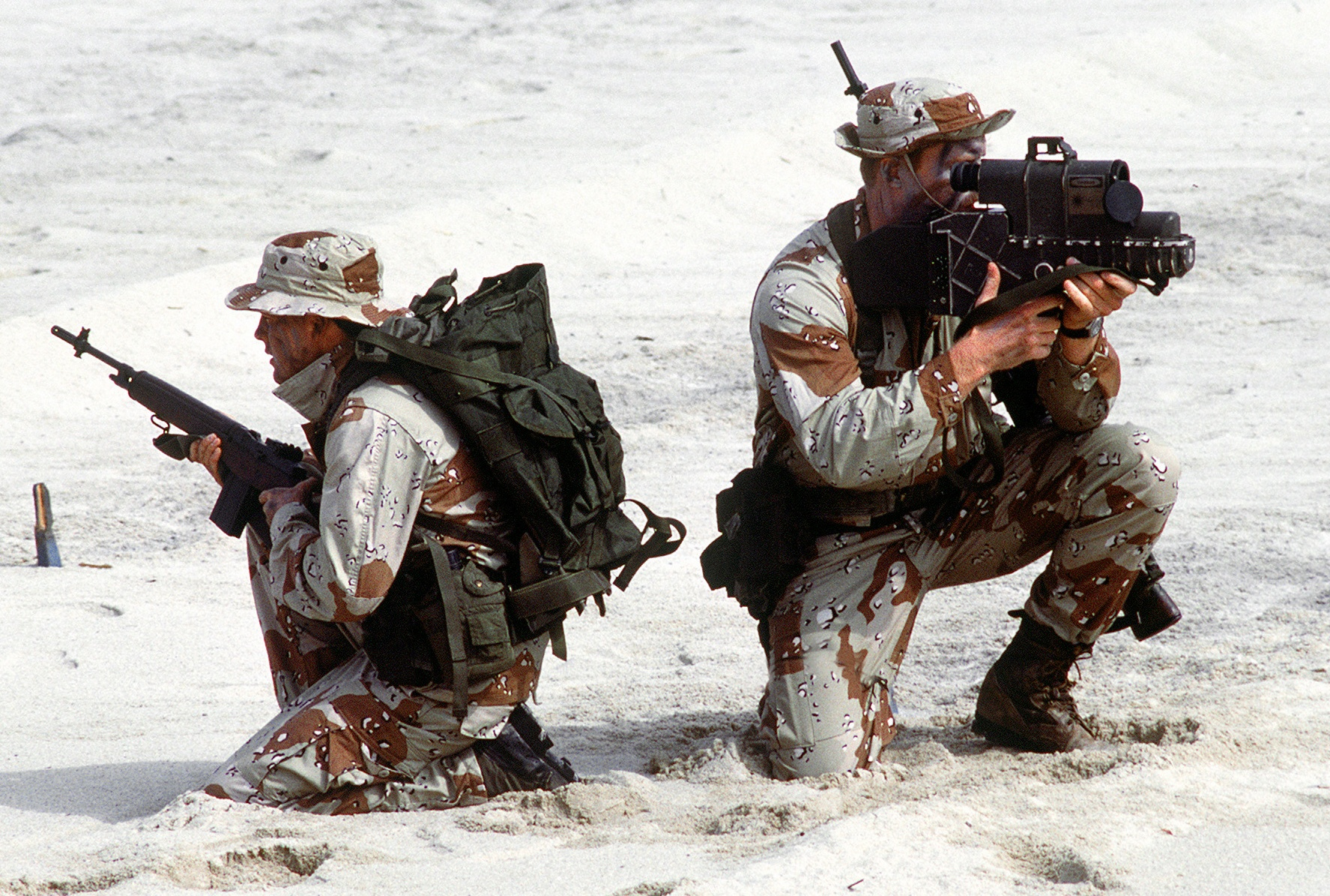
Two Sea-Air-Land (SEAL) team members, one equipped with an AN/PAQ-1 laser target designator, right, the other armed with an M14 rifle, assume a defensive position

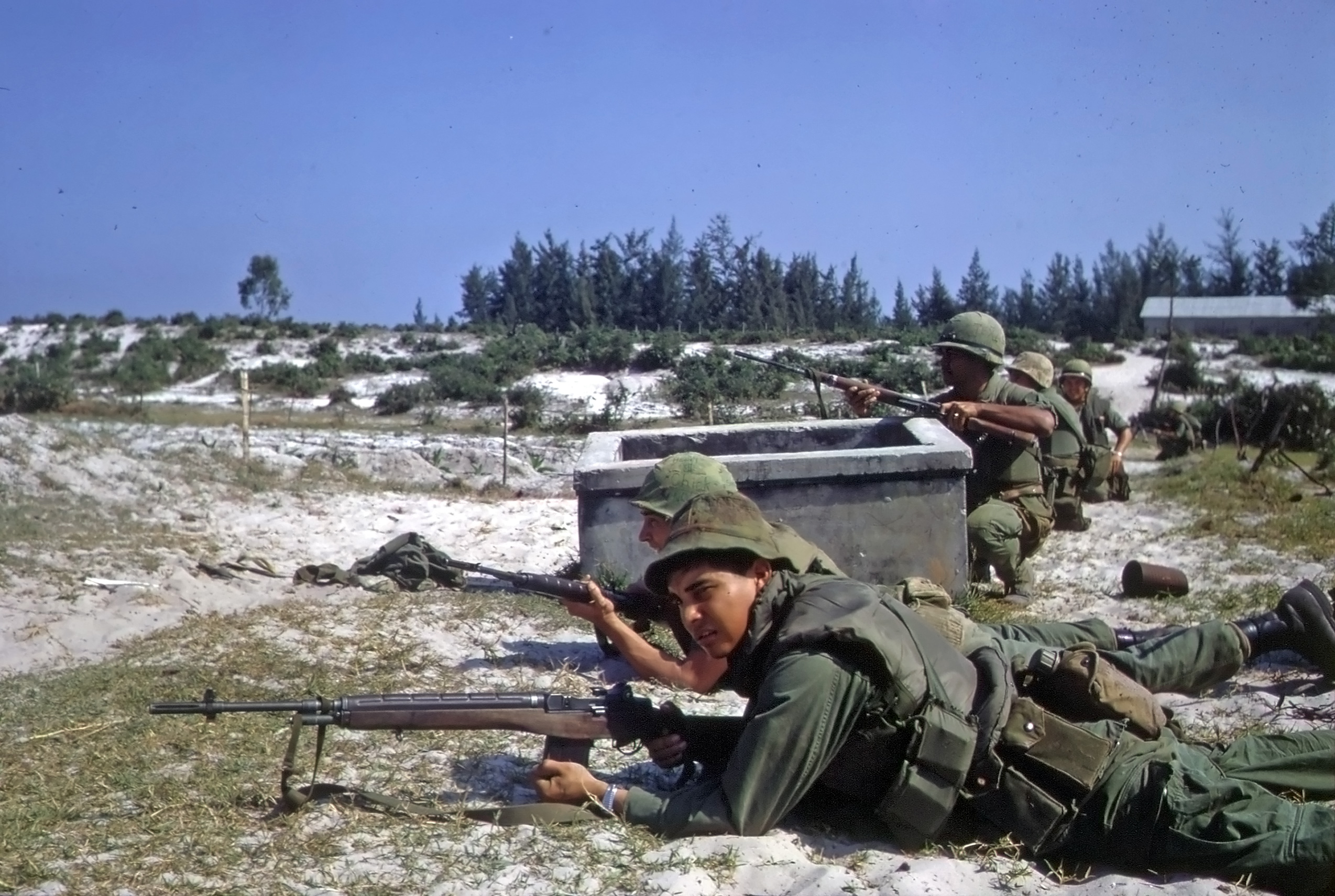
Battle of Hamo Village During the Tet Offensive. US Marines and ARVN troops defend a position against enemy attack. Photo taken circa January 1968.

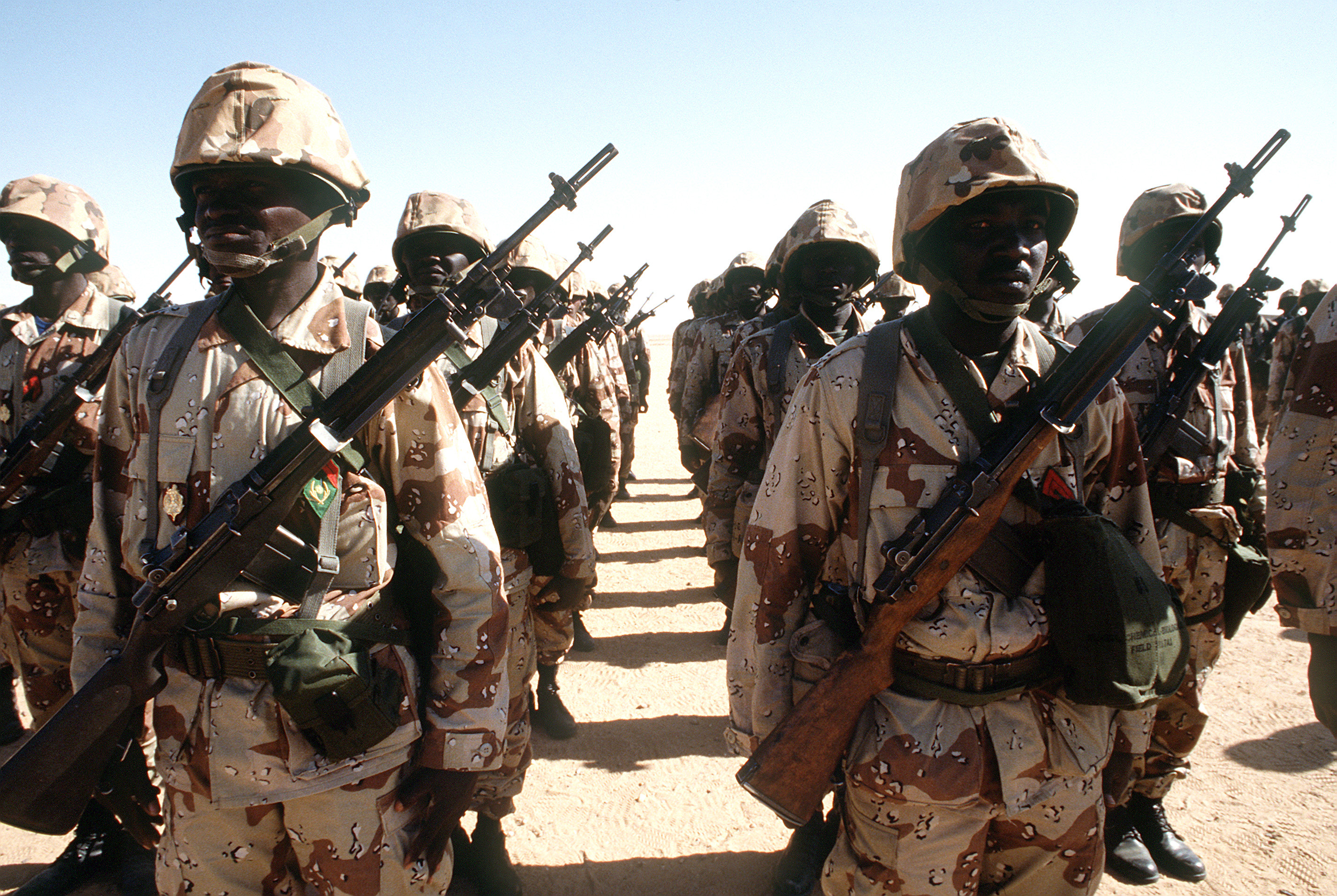
Soldiers in a Niger army unit stand in formation while a dignitary visits their outpost during Operation Desert Shield. The men are armed with M14 rifles.

== Conflicts ==
The M14 rifle has been used in the following conflicts:

- Vietnam War
- Dominican Civil War
- Ethiopian Civil War
- Lebanese Civil War
- Communist rebellion in the Philippines
- Moro conflict
- Ogaden War
- Sino-Vietnamese War
- Falklands War
- Salvadoran Civil War
- Soviet–Afghan War
- 2004 Haitian coup d'état
- Syrian Civil War
- Iraq War
- War in Afghanistan
- Mexican drug war
- Russian invasion of Ukraine

== Users ==
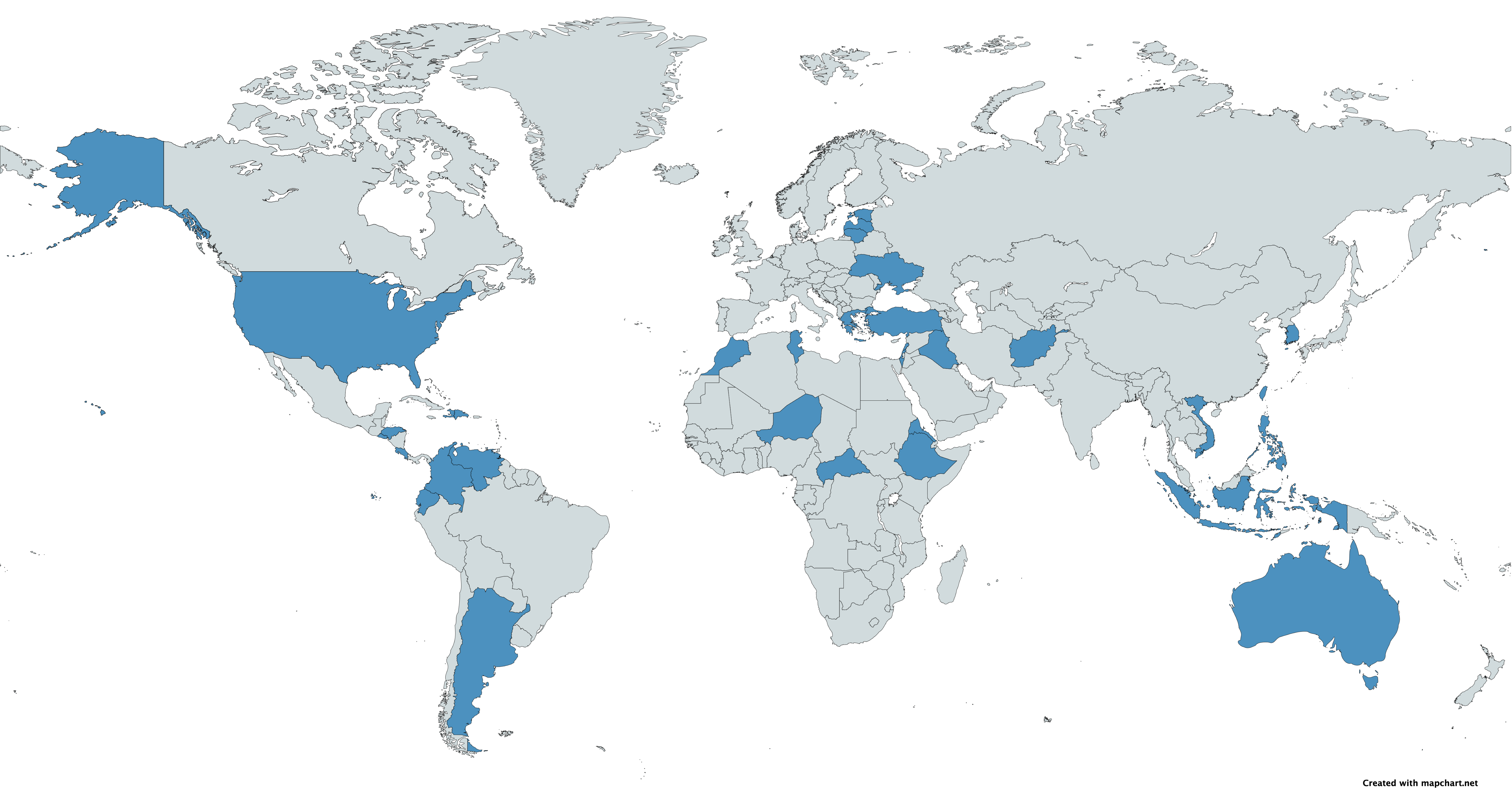
A map with M14 rifle users in blue

- Argentina: Used by Argentine soldiers of C Company, Regimento (Especial) de Infanteria 25 in the Falklands War at the Battle of Goose Green and San Carlos.
- Central African Republic: Self-defense units

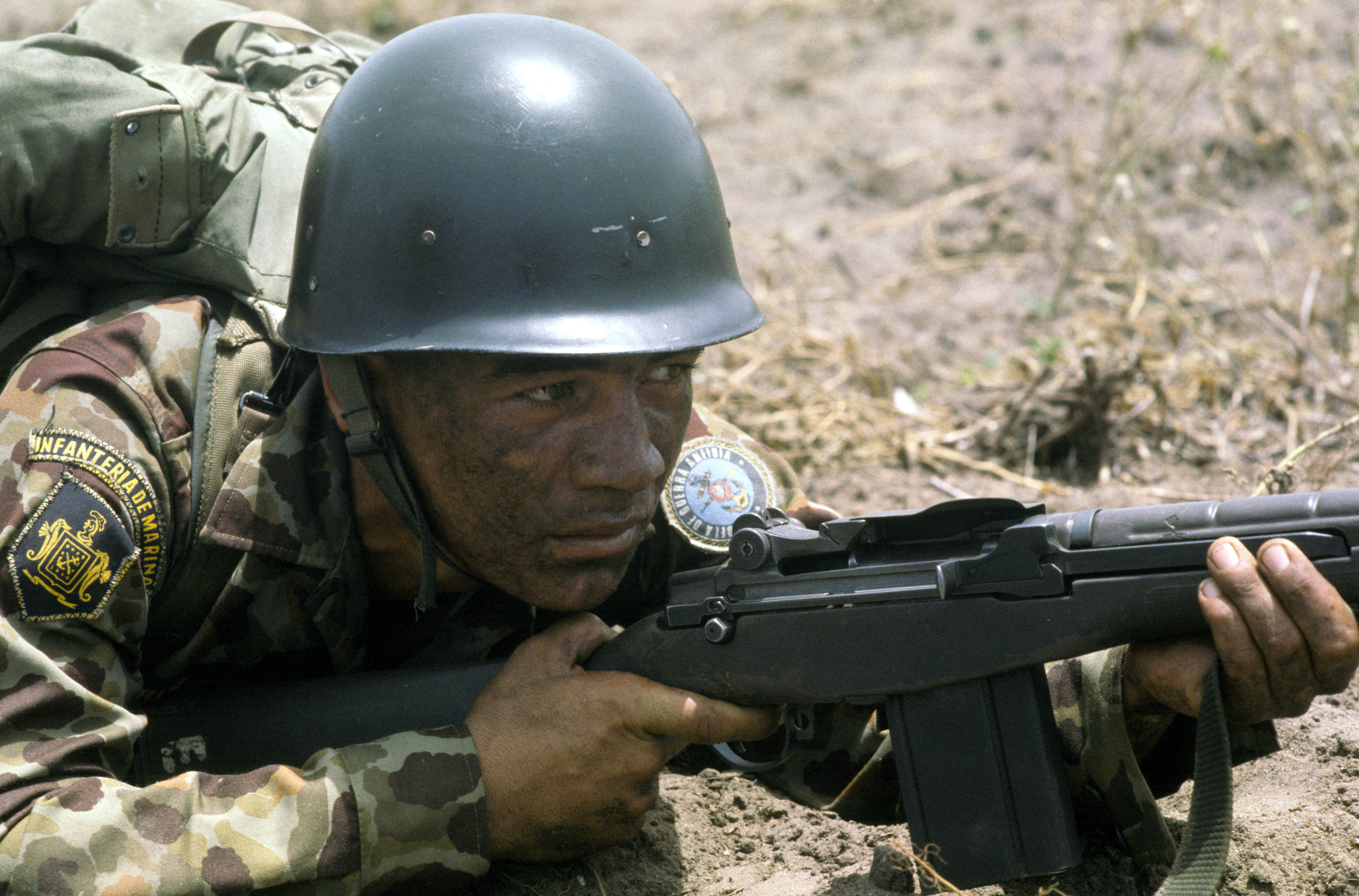
A Colombian Marine armed with an M14 rifle participates in the joint US and Colombian counter insurgency exercise.

- Colombia
- Costa Rica
- Dominican Republic
- Ecuador
- El Salvador
- Eritrea
- Estonia: 40 500 rifles donated by USA in 1998. Adopted by Estonian military as marksman's rifle, modified by E-Arsenal called the Täpsuspüss M14-TP (Precision Rifle M14-PR), with heavy barrel, bipod, synthetic stock, and optical 4× sight. The M14-TP 2 was used by Estonian troops in Afghanistan with the M14-TP. The M14 is also used as Estonia's ceremonial rifle. 35,000 M14s were donated to Ukraine in the spring 2022.
- Ethiopia
- Greece
- Haiti: Used by Haitian security forces in the 2004 Haitian coup d'état.
- Honduras
- Indonesia: Most are retired from the Armed forces, currently still being used by BRIMOB.
- Iraq: Used by Iraqi special forces under Counter-Terrorism Service control.
- Israel: Used as sniper rifle with eventual conversion and production as M89SR. Israeli M14s were modified with full auto disabled and the buttstock modified to have a built-in cheek piece.
- Latvia: Unknown number provided by the U.S. in the 1990s under military assistance program.
- Lebanon: Used by the Tigers Militia and the Zgharta Liberation Army as a battle rifle, and by the Lebanese Forces militia as a sniper rifle in the Lebanese Civil War.
- Lithuania: Lithuanian Armed Forces. Most Lithuanian M14s upgraded to M14 L1 as a DMR while others were upgraded to the M14 MDV and M14 EBR SOP standard for use by Lithuanian commandos.
- Morocco
- Niger
- Philippines: 104,000 used within the Armed Forces of the Philippines with most decommissioned.
- South Korea: Unknown number provided by the U.S. in the 1990s under military assistance program. Most of the M14s were scrapped and small numbers are used for ceremonial duties.

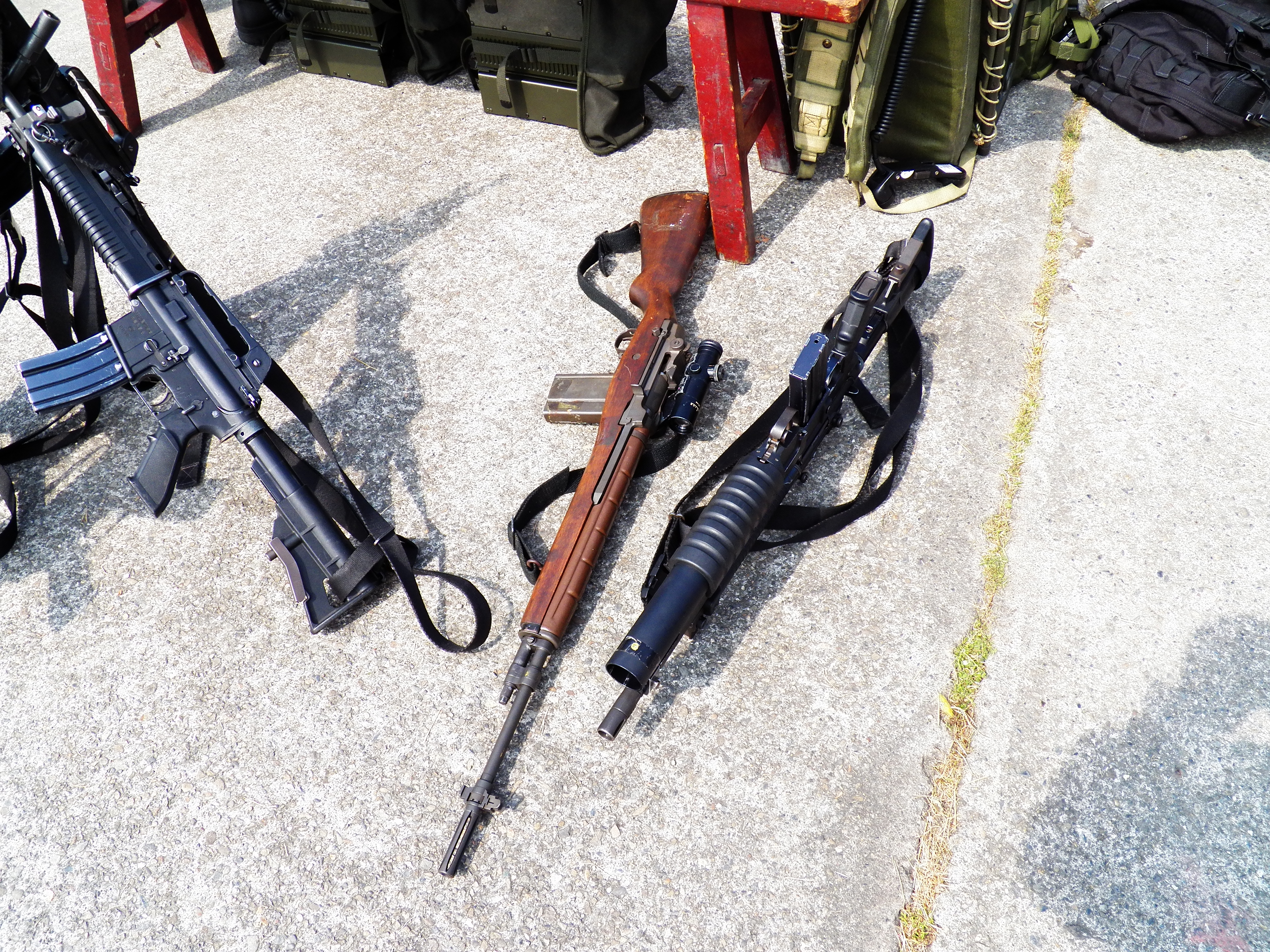
Type 57 sniper rifle, Taiwanese M14 authorized production model

- Taiwan (Republic of China): Made under license as the Type 57.
- Tunisia
- Turkey: Unknown number provided by the U.S. in the 1990s under military assistance program. Still in use with ship personnel of the Turkish Navy.
- Ukraine: Unknown number of M14 (or M21) have been spotted during the 2022 Russian invasion of Ukraine used by Territorial Defence.
- United States: Uses the M14SE, manufactured by Smith Enterprise Inc., in SDM roles and has purchased M14s from other manufacturers. Also uses the Mk 14 as well as M14s custom built or modified in military armories, such as the M39 Enhanced Marksman Rifle. The M14 is issued to crew members on Military Sealift Command vessels. The rifle is also used by the U.S. Border Patrol and by the Park Rangers of U.S. National Park Service.
  - Merced County Sheriff Department
- Venezuela
- Vietnam: After the Vietnam War, the People's Army of Vietnam inherited a large quantity of M14 rifles from the Republic of Vietnam Military Forces. In 2016, Factory Z113 successfully put the 7.62×51mm cartridge (designated M80) into mass-production for use in these M14s and other NATO firearms like the M60 machine gun and FN MAG.

=== Former ===
- Afghanistan: Used by soldiers of the Afghan National Army presidential guard for ceremonial duties.
- Australia: Small quantities of XM21 sniper variants were issued by the Australian Army in the Vietnam War. M14 EBRs were also fielded by Australian special operations forces in Afghanistan.
- South Vietnam: Few instances of ARVN troops acquiring M14 rifles from US troops with the M14E2 being the most desirable.

=== Non-state users ===
- Frente Nacional de Libertação de Angola
- Moro Islamic Liberation Front
- New People's Army

== See also ==
- AC-556, a selective fire variant of the Mini-14, a rifle visually based on the M14 and chambered in .223 Remington
- Beretta BM 59, a battle rifle based on the M1 Garand and chambered in 7.62×51mm NATO
- Springfield Armory M1A, a semi-automatic rifle based on the M14

| Preceded by M1 Garand | United States Army rifle 1958–1967 | Succeeded by M16 rifle |
