= M25 Sniper Weapon System =

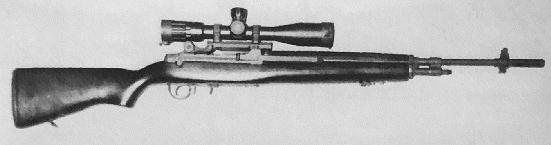
- The M25
- Type: Sniper rifle/designated marksman rifle
- Place of origin: United States

Service history
- In service: 1991 (possibly earlier) – present
- Used by: United States
- Wars: Gulf War

Production history
- Designer: 10th Special Forces Group
- Designed: Late 1980s
- Manufacturer: Springfield Armory (commercial version)

Specifications
- Mass: 4.9 kg (11 lb)
- Length: 1,125 mm (44.3 in)
- Barrel length: 560 mm (22 in)
- Cartridge: 7.62×51mm NATO (.308 Winchester)
- Action: Rotating bolt, Gas operated, Air cooled
- Rate of fire: semi-automatic
- Muzzle velocity: 850 m/s (2800 ft/s)
- Maximum firing range: 900 m (980 yd)
- Feed system: 5, 10, or 20 round detachable box magazine
- Sights: Bausch & Lomb Tactical 10×40

The M25 Sniper Weapon System is a joint venture precision rifle built for the U.S. Army Special Forces and later adopted by the U.S. Navy SEALs. It was originally developed by the 10th Special Forces Group, based at Fort Devens, Mass., to fulfill a requirement for a sniper rifle based on a match grade M14 that satisfied the requirements of the Army Special Forces.

SOCOM called the rifle the "Light Sniper Rifle", and it is also known as the "Sniper Security System" and "Product Improved M21". The commercial version has been named "White Feather" in honor of Carlos Hathcock, the U.S. Marine Corps sniper who became famous during the Vietnam War. (The enemy called him "White Feather" because he wore a white feather on his hat to taunt enemy troops hoping to collect a large bounty for his death or capture offered by the enemy.)

The M25 is not a replacement rifle for the M24 Sniper Weapon System; it was designed to fill a specific need for accurate fire beyond the range of a standard-issue carbine and has been used from the Persian Gulf War onwards as the designated marksman's rifle (DMR). As the DMR, the M25 gives either the sniper's spotter or a squad-level marksman a long-range rifle that can be fired at a faster rate than a sniper's bolt-action rifle.

== Design ==
The M25 is similar in many ways to the M21. It has a National Match M14 barrel in a McMillan glass bedded fiberglass stock, uses a special gas piston, a National Match spring guide and a Brookfield Precision Tool Advanced Scope Mounting System. Most rifles use the Bausch & Lomb 10× Tactical scope; some use scopes made by Leupold & Stevens, including the Ultra Mark 4 M1, Ultra Mark 4 M3, and Vari X-III LR M3. Suppressors for use with this rifle are manufactured by OPS.
