= Scission =

Scission may refer to:

- Scission (chemistry), bond cleavage, the splitting of chemical bonds
  - Chain scission, the degradation of a polymer main chain
  - Beta scission, reaction in thermal cracking of hydrocarbons
- Scission and Other Stories, a 1985 collection of short stories
- Instruction scission, opcode overlapping in computing

== See also ==
- Scission (a cut-out piece), term involved in development of senses of word "sect"
