= Thermal degradation of polymers =

Type of polymer degradation

In polymers, such as plastics, thermal degradation refers to a type of polymer degradation where damaging chemical changes take place at elevated temperatures, without the simultaneous involvement of other compounds such as oxygen. Simply put, even in the absence of air, polymers will begin to degrade if heated high enough. It is distinct from thermal-oxidation, which can usually take place at less elevated temperatures.

The onset of thermal degradation dictates the maximum temperature at which a polymer can be used. It is an important limitation in how the polymer is manufactured and processed. For instance, polymers become less viscous at higher temperatures which makes injection moulding easier and faster, but thermal degradation places a ceiling temperature on this. Polymer devolatilization is similarly effected. At high temperatures, the components of the long chain backbone of the polymer can break (chain scission) and react with one another (cross-link) to change the properties of the polymer. These reactions result in changes to the molecular weight (and molecular weight distribution) of the polymer and can affect its properties by causing reduced ductility and increased embrittlement, chalking, scorch, colour changes, cracking and general reduction in most other desirable physical properties.

== Reaction pathways ==
=== Depolymerisation ===
Under thermal effect, the end of polymer chain departs, and forms low free radical which has low activity. Then according to the chain reaction mechanism, the polymer loses the monomer one by one. However, the molecular chain doesn't change a lot in a short time. The reaction is shown below. This process is common for polymethylmethacrylate (perspex).

CH_{2}-C(CH_{3})COOCH_{3}-CH_{2}-C*(CH_{3})COOCH_{3}→CH_{2}-C*(CH_{3})COOCH_{3} + CH_{2}=C(CH_{3})COOCH_{3}

=== Side-group elimination ===
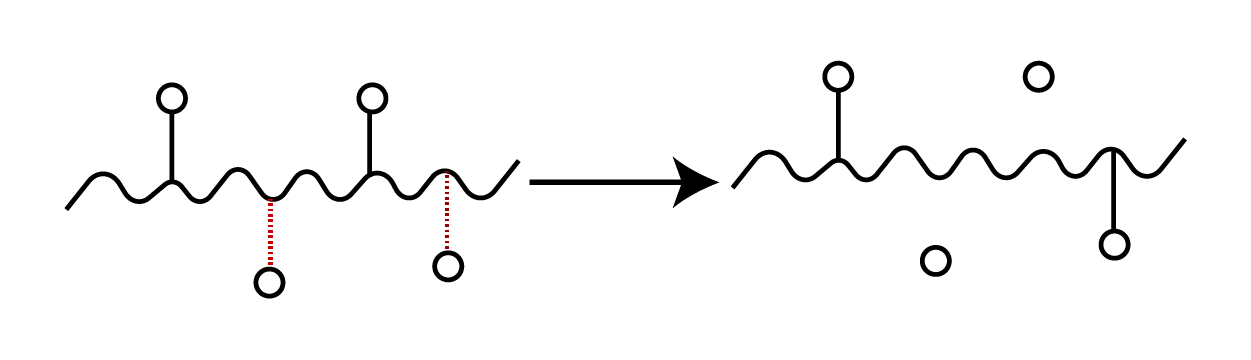
Side-group elimination (Sidechain degradation)

Groups that are attached to the side of the backbone are held by bonds which are weaker than the bonds connecting the chain. When the polymer is heated, the side groups are stripped off from the chain before it is broken into smaller pieces. For example, the PVC eliminates HCl, under 100–120 °C.

CH_{2}(Cl)CHCH_{2}CH(Cl)→CH=CH-CH=CH+2HCl

Side group elimination can also proceed in a radical manner. For instance, methyl groups in polypropylene are susceptible to homolysis at high temperatures, leaving radicals on the polymer backbone.

=== Random chain scission ===
Radicals formed on the polymer backbone by either hydrogen abstraction side-group elimination can cause the chain to break by beta scission. As a result the molecular weight decreases rapidly. As new free radicals with high reactivity are formed, monomers cannot be a product of this reaction, also intermolecular chain transfer and disproportion termination reactions can occur.

CH_{2}-CH_{2}-CH_{2}-CH_{2}-CH_{2}-CH_{2}-CH_{2}'→ CH_{2}-CH_{2}-CH=CH_{2} + CH_{3}-CH_{2}-CH_{2}' or CH_{2}'+CH_{2}=CH-CH_{2}-CH_{2}-CH_{2}-CH_{3}

As polymers approach their ceiling temperature scission starts to take place randomly on the backbone.

=== Oxidation of the polymer ===
Although thermal degradation is defined as an oxygen free process it is difficult in practise to completely exclude oxygen. Where this is the case thermal oxidation is to be expected, leading to the formation of free radicals by way of hydroperoxides. These may then participate in thermal degradation reactions, accelerating the rate of breakdown.

== Analytical Methods ==
=== TGA ===
(Thermogravimetric analysis) (TGA) refers to the techniques where a sample is heated in a controlled atmosphere at a defined heating rate whilst the sample's mass is measured. When a polymer sample degrades, its mass decreases due to the production of gaseous products like carbon monoxide, water vapour and carbon dioxide.

=== DTA and DSC ===
(Differential thermal analysis) (DTA) and (differential scanning calorimetry) (DSC): Analyzing the heating effect of polymer during the physical changes in terms of glass transition, melting, and so on. These techniques measure the heat flow associated with oxidation.

== See also ==
- Autoxidation
- Photo-oxidation of polymers
- Weather testing of polymers
- Environmental stress cracking
