= UV curing =

Chemical process

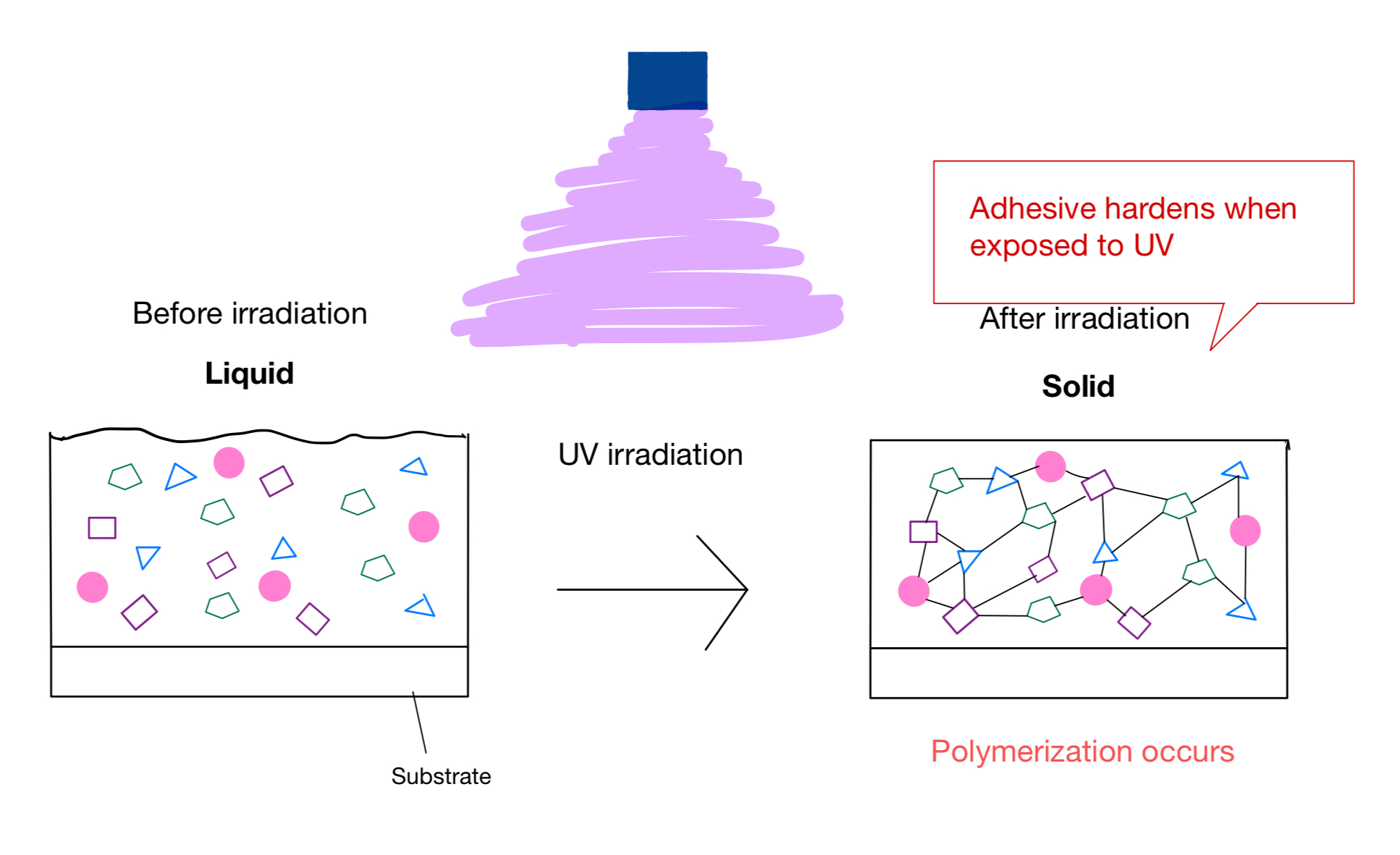
Polymerization and cross linking occurs during UV curing

UV curing (ultraviolet curing) is the process by which ultraviolet light initiates a photochemical reaction that generates a crosslinked network of polymers through radical polymerization or cationic polymerization. UV curing is adaptable to printing, coating, decorating, stereolithography, and in the assembly of a variety of products and materials. UV curing is a low-temperature, high speed, and solventless process as curing occurs via polymerization. Originally introduced in the 1960s, this technology has streamlined and increased automation in many industries in the manufacturing sector.

== Applications ==
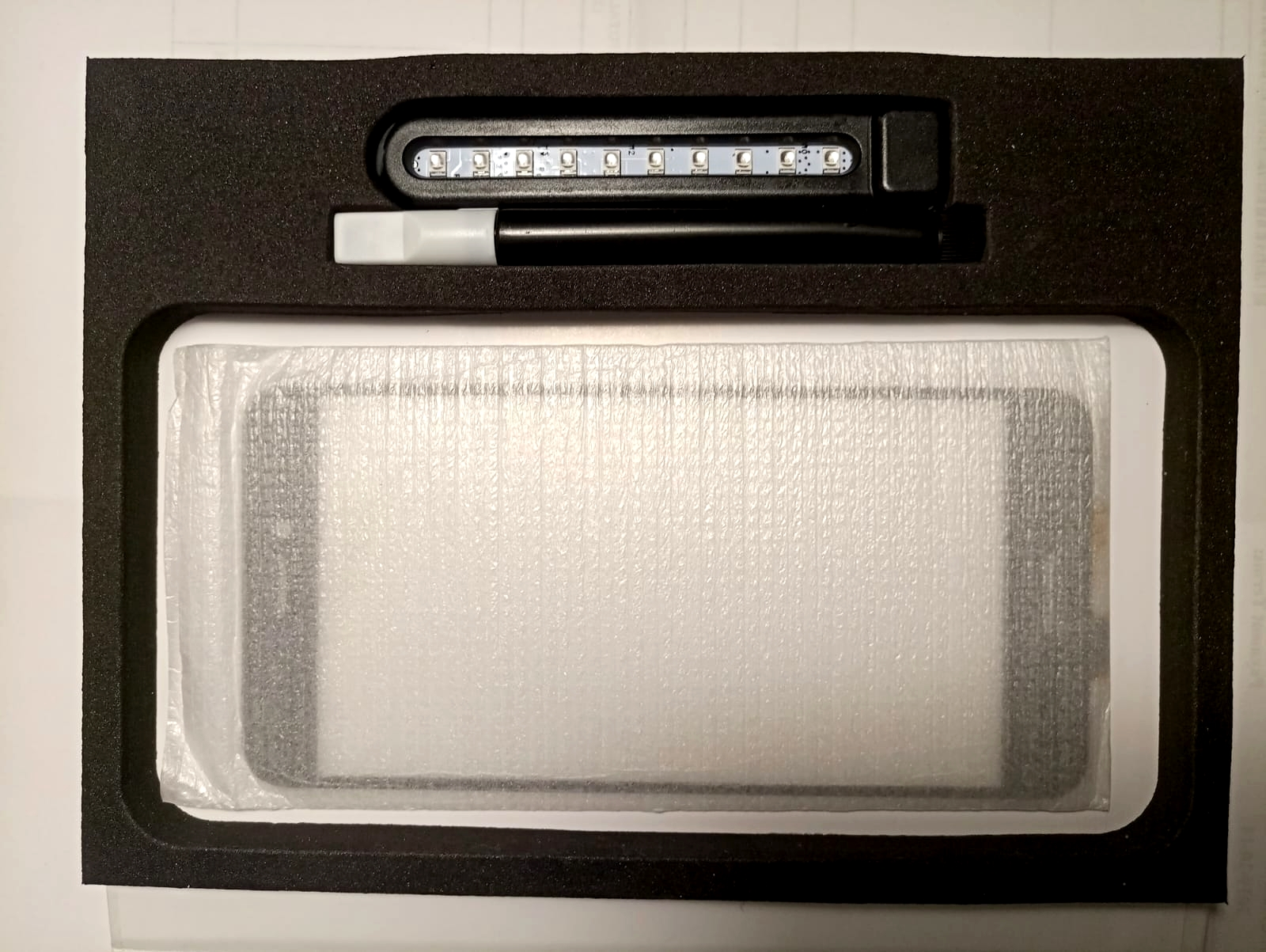
UV curing Kit for Huawei screen repair

UV curing is used for converting or curing inks, adhesives, and coatings. UV-cured adhesive has become a high speed replacement for two-part adhesives, eliminating the need for solvent removal, ratio mixing, and potential life concern. It is used in flexographic, offset, pad, and screen printing processes; where UV curing systems are used to polymerize images on screen-printed products, ranging from T-shirts to 3D and cylindrical parts. It is used in fine instrument finishing (guitars, violins, ukuleles, etc.), pool cue manufacturing and other wood craft industries. Printing with UV curable inks provides the ability to print on a very wide variety of substrates such as plastics, paper, canvas, glass, metal, foam boards, tile, films, and many other materials.

Industries that use UV curing include medicine, automobiles, cosmetics (for example artificial fingernails and gel nail polish), food, science, education, and art. UV curable inks have successfully met the demands of the publication sector in terms of print quality, durability, and compatibility with different substrates, making them a suitable choice for printing applications in this industry.

== Advantages of UV curing ==
A primary advantage of curing with ultraviolet light is the speed at which a material can be processed. Speeding up the curing, or drying step, in a process can reduce flaws and errors by decreasing time that an ink or coating spends as wet. This can increase the quality of a finished item, and potentially allow for greater consistency. Another benefit to decreasing manufacturing time is that less space needs to be devoted to storing items which can not be used until the drying step is finished.

Because UV energy has unique interactions with many different materials, UV curing allows for the creation of products with characteristics not achievable via other means. This has led to UV curing becoming fundamental in many fields of manufacturing and technology, where changes in strength, hardness, durability, chemical resistance, and many other properties are required.

UV curing also enables control of surface appearance, allowing high gloss or matte finishes depending on formulation and process (for example, use of matting agents or excimer UV curing).

== Constituents of a UV curing system ==
=== Main components in UV cured solution ===
The main components of a UV curing solution include resins, monomers, and photoinitiators. Resin is an oligomer that imparts specific properties to the final polymer. A monomer is used as a cross-linking agent and regulates the viscosity of the mixture to suit the application. The photoinitiator is responsible for absorbing the light and kickstarting the reaction, which helps control the cure rate and depth of cure. Each of these elements has a role to play in the crosslinking process and is linked to the composition of the final polymer.

=== Types of UV curing lamps ===
==== Medium-pressure lamps ====
Medium-pressure mercury-vapor lamps have historically been the industry standard for curing products with ultraviolet light. The bulbs work by sending an electric discharge to excite a mixture of mercury and noble gases, generating a plasma. Once the mercury reaches a plasma state, it irradiates a high spectral output in the UV region of the electromagnetic spectrum. Major peaks in light intensity occur in the 240-270 nm and 350-380 nm regions. These intense peaks, when matched with the absorption profile of a photoinitiator, cause the rapid curing of materials. By modifying the bulb mixture with different gases and metal halides, the distribution of wavelength peaks can be altered, and material interactions are changed.

Medium-pressure lamps can either be standard gas-discharge lamps or electrodeless lamps, and typically use an elongated bulb to emit energy. By incorporating optical designs such an elliptical or even aconic reflector, light can either be focused or projected over a far distance. These lamps can often operate at over 900 degrees Celsius and produce UV energy levels over 10 W/cm^{2}.

==== Low-pressure lamps ====
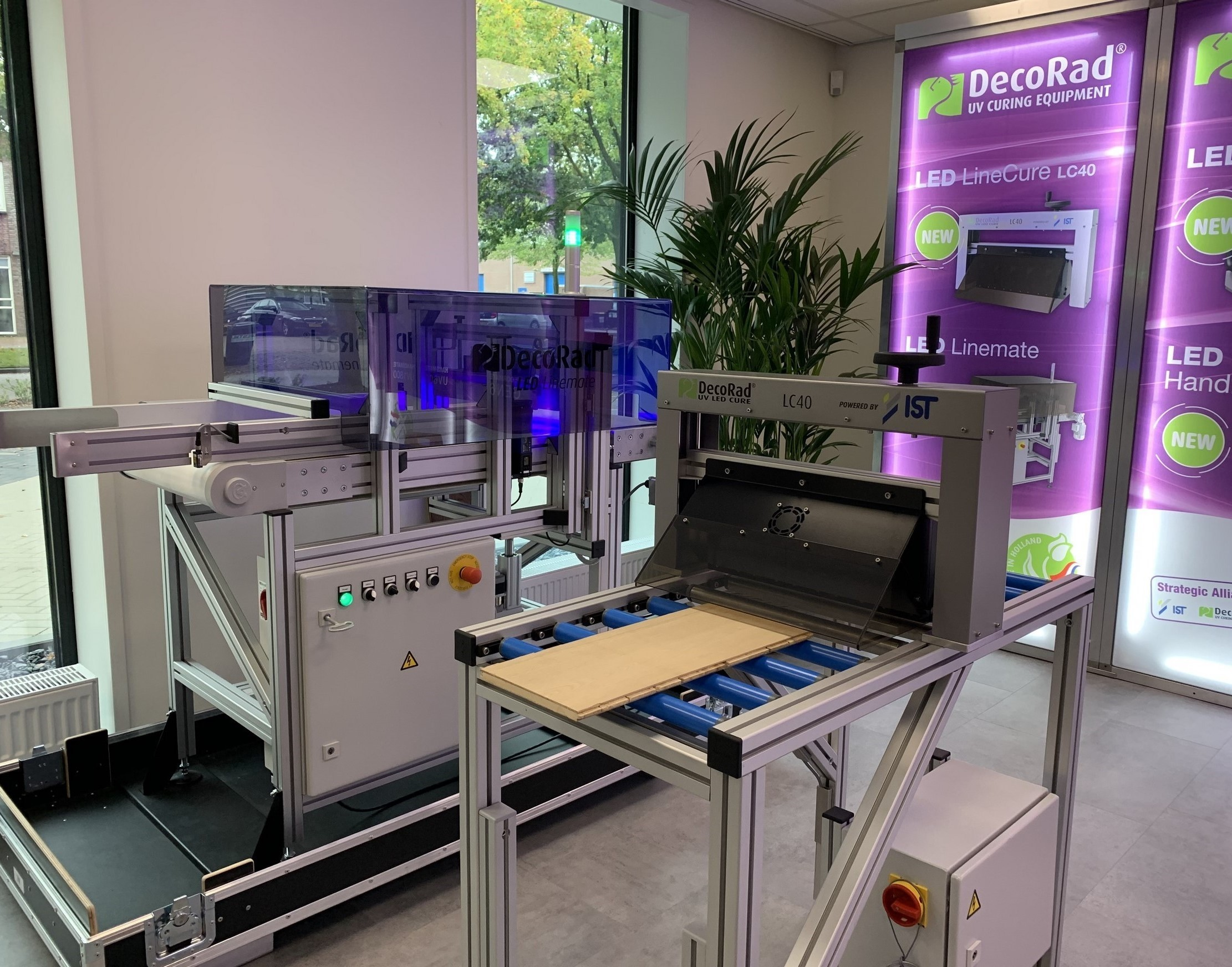
UV LED Curing equipment

Low-pressure mercury-vapor lamps generate primarily 254 nm 'UVC' energy, and are most commonly used in disinfection applications. Operated at lower temperatures and with less voltage than medium-pressure lamps, they, like all UV sources, require shielding when operated to prevent excess exposure of skin and eyes.

==== UV LED ====
Since development of the aluminium gallium nitride LED in the early 2000s, UV LED technology has seen sustained growth in the UV curing marketplace. Generating energy most efficiently in the 365-405 nm 'UVA' wavelengths, continued technological advances, have allowed for improved electrical efficiency of UV LEDs as well as significant increases in output. Benefiting from lower-temperature operation and the lack of hazardous mercury, UV LEDs have replaced medium-pressure lamps in many applications. Major limitations include difficulties in designing optics for curing on complex three-dimensional objects, and poor efficiency at generating lower-wavelength energy, though development work continues.

== Mechanisms of UV curing ==
=== Radical Polymerization ===
Radical Polymerization is used in the curing of acrylic resins in the presence of UV in the industry. Light energy from UV breaks apart photoinitiaters, forming radicals. The radical then react with the polymers, forming polymers with radical groups that then react with additional monomers. The monomer chain extends until it reaches another polymer and reacts with the polymer. Polymers will form with monomer bridges between them, thus leading to a cross-linked network.

=== Cationic Polymerization ===
Cationic polymerization is used in the curing of epoxy resins in the presence of UV in the industry. Light energy from UV breaks apart photoinitiaters, forming an acidic solution which then donates a proton to the polymer. The monomers then attach themselves to the polymer, forming longer and longer chains leading to a cross-linked network.

== See also ==
- Photopolymer
- UV stabilizers in plastics
- Weather testing of polymers
- Radical Polymerization
- Cationic Polymerization
