= Pole marquee =

Large tent

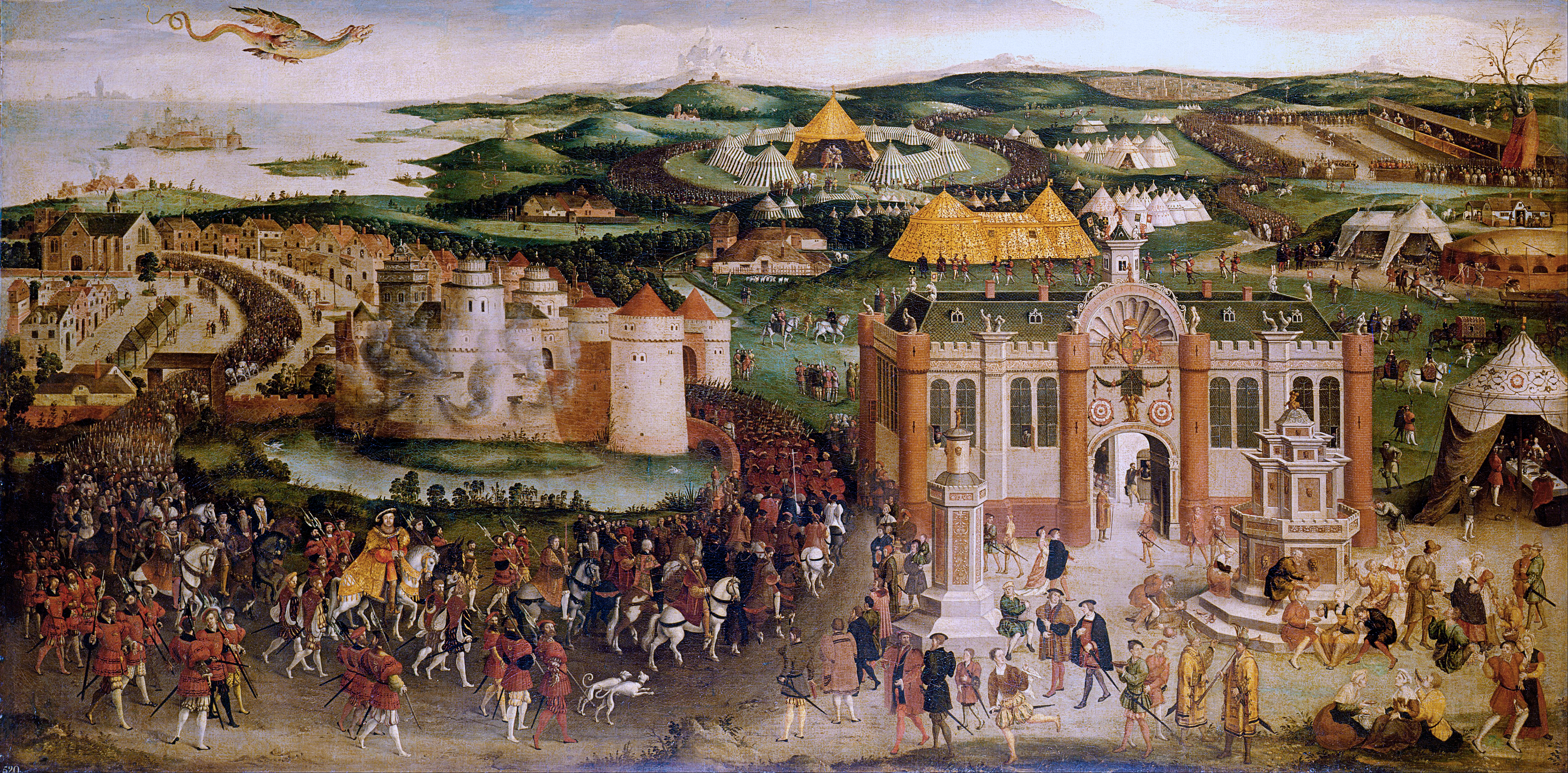
Field of the Cloth of Gold (1520) – several marquees can be seen in the background

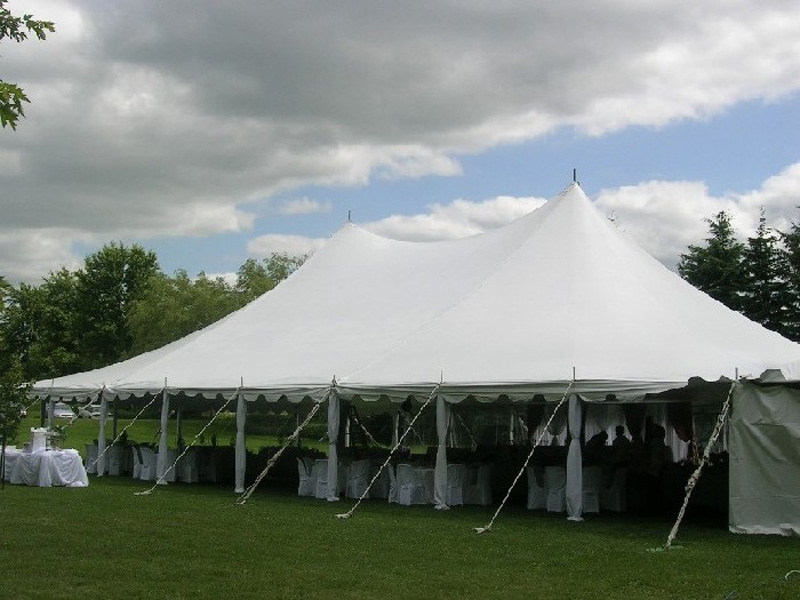
Traditional white pole tent

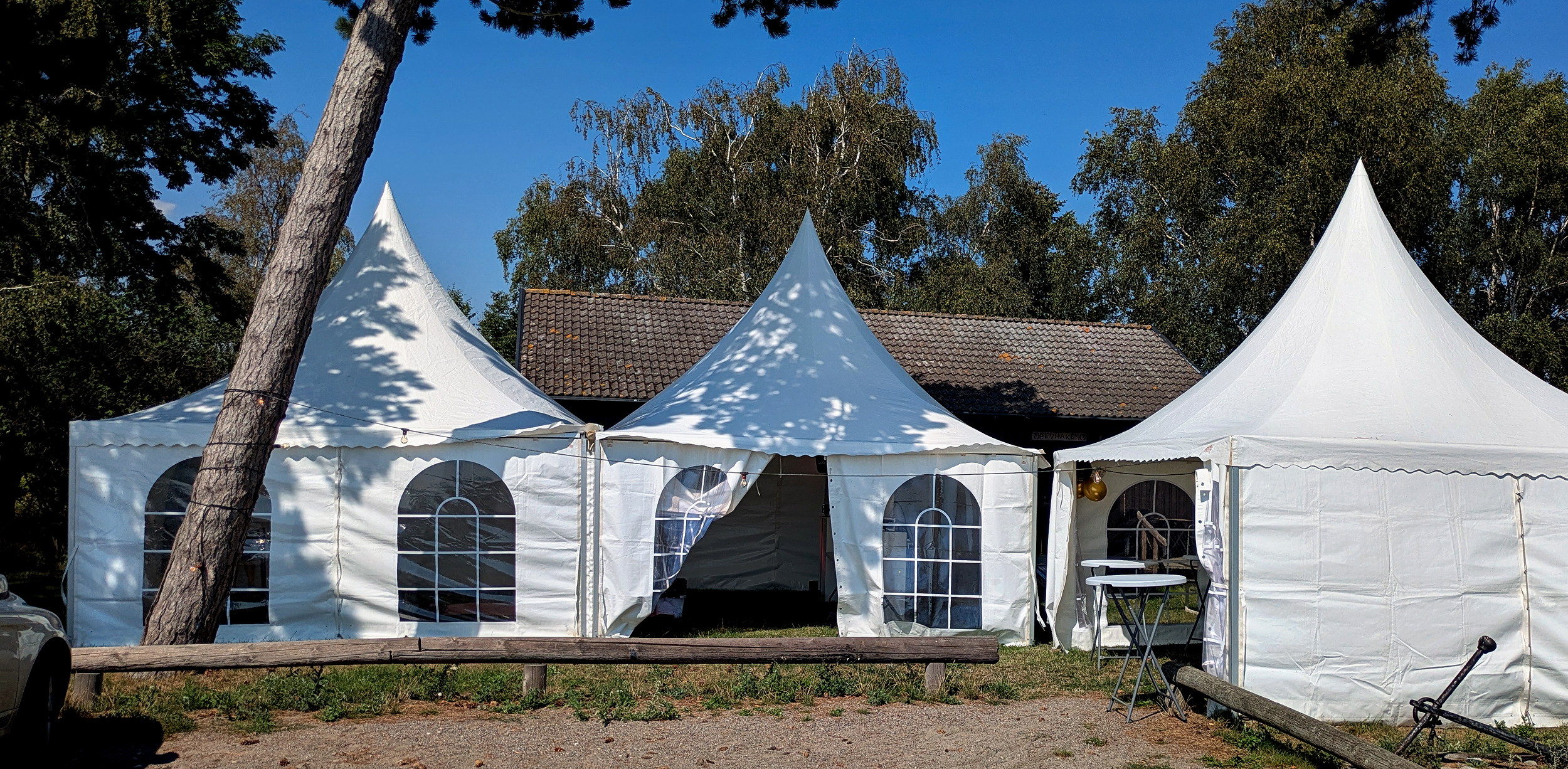
Pole tent with walls and windows.

A pole marquee, more commonly just marqee in British English, or pole tent is a variety of large tent often used to shelter summer events such as shows, festivals, and weddings. They are particularly associated with typical English country garden weddings and village fetes.

The basic design has changed little in thousands of years. A pole marquee consists of a roof canopy supported by tall central poles ("king poles") tensioned using side lines connected to ground pins (or stakes) and smaller supporting poles ("side poles"). The king poles support the bulk of the weight, while the side poles give the fabric shape.

Historically, pole marquees were manufactured from cotton canvas, wooden poles, and hessian rope; but use of these materials has been largely superseded by PVC canvas, metal poles, and synthetic ropes.

The introduction of modern fabrics has extended the useful life of marquee covers and made them far easier to clean. This has been of benefit to the marquee hire and event industries. Canvas marquees are still available and in recent years have seen a resurgence as natural materials become fashionable once more. Both materials offer some advantages over the other, particularly that the breathability of canvas allows better air circulation, but that PVC covers better withstand phototendering.

It is inadvisable to use a traditional marquee during winter months due to the hazards associated with snow buildup, damp ground and high winds. With these inherent limitations, marquees are better equipped for warm, still weather unless fitted with features designed to reduce these hazards.
