= CNEP =

CNEP may refer:

- National Centre for the Evaluation of Photoprotection
- Comptoir national d'escompte de Paris
