= Aconic reflector =

Non-mathematically shaped light reflector

An aconic reflector refers to a light energy reflector that is not defined by a mathematical equation.

== Overview ==
Most light energy reflectors are based on conic sections such as parabolas, ellipses and circles. Aconic reflector is a generic term used to explain a reflective curve outside these groups. It literally means not conic. They are usually created with the intention of generating a specific result not achievable using conic curves. At times they are created using combinations of definable curves but not always. Modern light tracing software can generate curves using impact angles to generate a point cloud to define a required shape.

== Application ==
Aconic reflectors are used in ultraviolet light UV curing devices to smooth light density for a more uniform curing pattern. They can be used to mask hot spots generated by the lamp envelope and cold areas created by shadows. They can be used to illuminate a specific shape at a given distance. Examples include a search light reflector that is intentionally designed to generate a divergent beam, or a reflective curve with the intention of generating an aesthetic light effect.

If the reflective surface of a component is defined by a point cloud instead of being defined by a mathematical equation, it is likely an aconic reflector.

== See also ==
- Adjustable Ranging Telescope
- Acousto-optical spectrometer
