= Photo-oxidation of polymers =

Phenomenon in chemistry

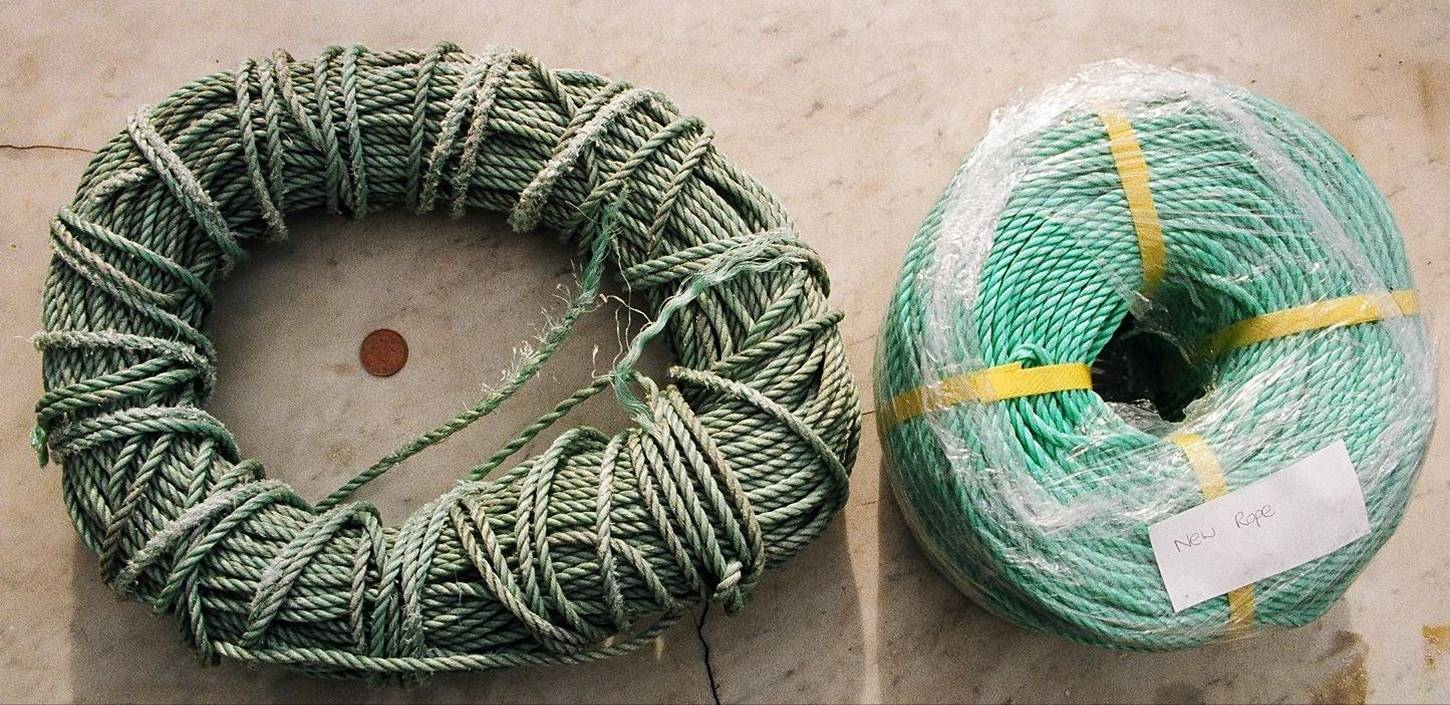
Comparison of rope which has been degraded by weathering to fresh rope. Note the fraying and discolouration.

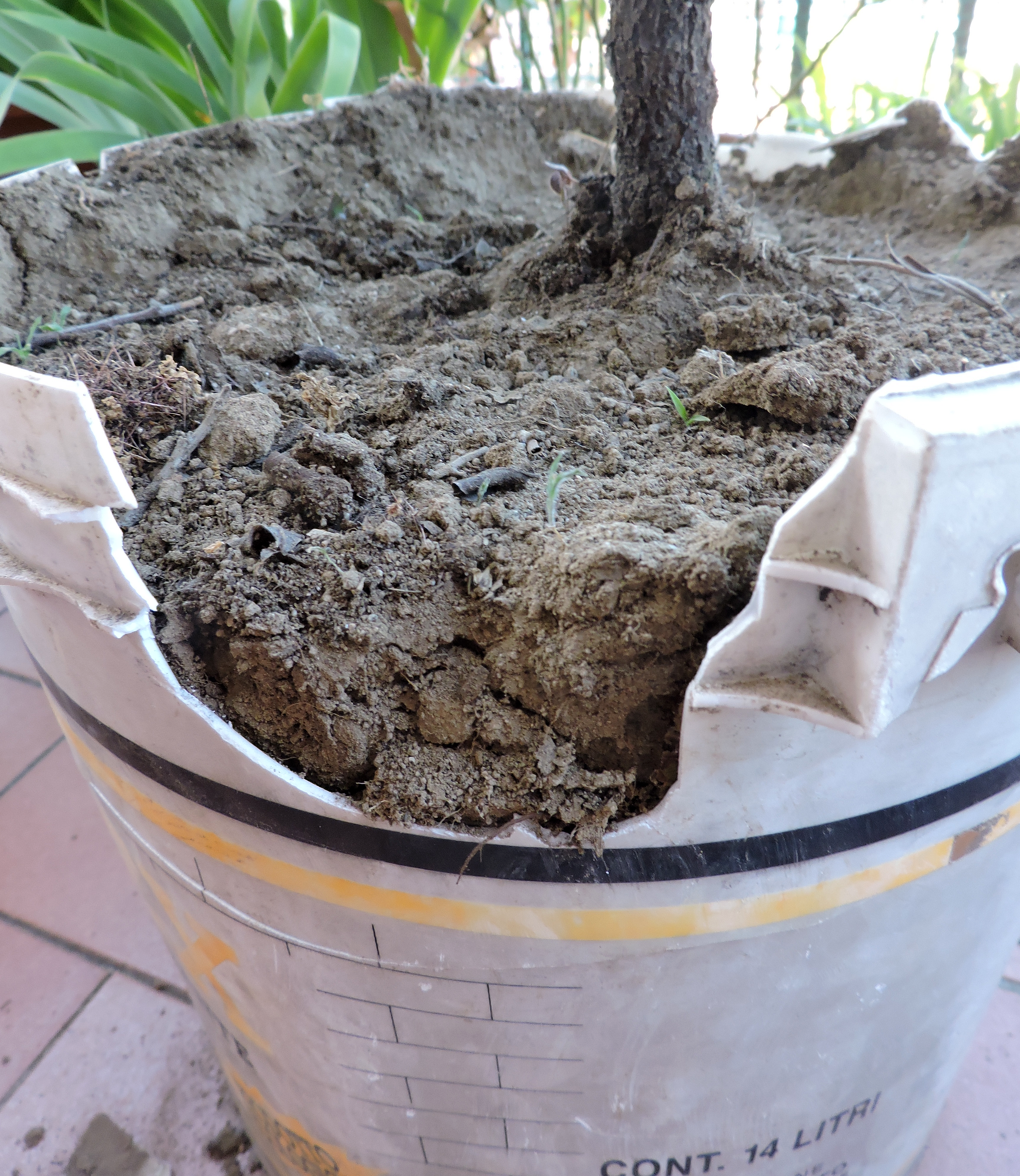
This plastic bucket has been used as an open-air flowerpot for some years. Photodegradation has made it brittle, causing part of it to break off when the bucket was moved.

In polymer chemistry, photo-oxidation (sometimes: oxidative photodegradation) is the degradation of a polymer surface due to the combined action of light and oxygen. It is the most significant factor in the weathering of plastics. Photo-oxidation causes the polymer chains to break (chain scission), resulting in the material becoming increasingly brittle. This leads to mechanical failure and, at an advanced stage, the formation of microplastics. In textiles, the process is called phototendering.

Technologies have been developed to both accelerate and inhibit this process. For example, plastic building components like doors, window frames and gutters are expected to last for decades, requiring the use of advanced UV-polymer stabilizers. Conversely, single-use plastics can be treated with biodegradable additives to accelerate their fragmentation. Many pigments and dyes can similarly have effects due to their ability to absorb UV-energy.

== Susceptible polymers ==
2013 demand for plastics in Europe, by polymer type: PP: polypropylene, PE: polyethylene, PVC: Polyvinyl chloride, PS: Polystyrene, PET: Polyethylene terephthalate

Susceptibility to photo-oxidation varies depending on the chemical structure of the polymer. Some materials have excellent stability, such as fluoropolymers, polyimides, silicones and certain acrylate polymers. However, global polymer production is dominated by a range of commodity plastics which account for the majority of plastic waste. Of these polyethylene terephthalate (PET) has only moderate UV resistance and the others, which include polystyrene, polyvinyl chloride (PVC) and polyolefins like polypropylene (PP) and polyethylene (PE) are all highly susceptible.

Photo-oxidation is a form of photodegradation and begins with formation of free radicals on the polymer chain, which then react with oxygen in chain reactions. For many polymers the general autoxidation mechanism is a reasonable approximation of the underlying chemistry. The process is autocatalytic, generating increasing numbers of radicals and reactive oxygen species. These reactions result in changes to the molecular weight (and molecular weight distribution) of the polymer and as a consequence the material becomes more brittle. The process can be divided into four stages:

Initiation the process of generating the initial free radical.
Propagation the conversion of one active species to another
Chain branching steps which end with more than one active species being produced. The photolysis of hydroperoxides is the main example.
Termination steps in which active species are removed, for instance by radical disproportionation

Photo-oxidation can occur simultaneously with other processes like thermal degradation, and each of these can accelerate the other.

=== Polyolefins ===
Polyolefins such as polyethylene and polypropylene are susceptible to photo-oxidation and around 70% of light stabilizers produced world-wide are used in their protection, despite them representing only around 50% of global plastic production. Aliphatic hydrocarbons can only adsorb high energy UV-rays with a wavelength below ~250 nm, however the Earth's atmosphere and ozone layer screen out such rays, with the normal minimum wavelength being 280–290 nm. The bulk of the polymer is therefore photo-inert and degradation is instead attributed to the presence of various impurities, which are introduced during the manufacturing or processing stages. These include hydroperoxide and carbonyl groups, as well as metal salts such as catalyst residues.

All of these species act as photoinitiators. The organic hydroperoxide and carbonyl groups are able to absorb UV light above 290 nm whereupon they undergo photolysis to generate radicals. Metal impurities act as photocatalysts, although such reactions can be complex. It has also been suggested that polymer-O_{2} charge-transfer complexes are involved. Initiation generates radical-carbons on the polymer chain, sometimes called macroradicals (P•).

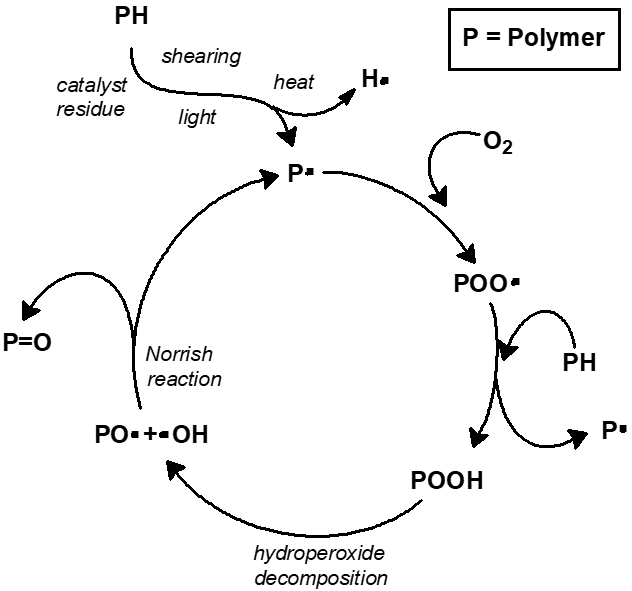
The cyclic mechanism of autoxidation

Chain initiation

$$\ce{Polymer -> P\bullet +\  P\bullet}$$

Chain propagation

$$\ce{P\bullet +\ O2 -> POO\bullet}$$
$$\ce{POO\bullet +\ PH -> {POOH} +\ P\bullet}$$

Chain branching

$$\ce{POOH -> PO\bullet +\  OH\bullet}$$
$$\ce{{PH} + OH\bullet -> P\bullet +\ H2O}$$
$$\ce{PO\bullet -> Chain\ scission\ reactions}$$

Termination

$$\ce{POO\bullet +\ POO\bullet -> cross\ linking\ reaction\ to\ non-radical\ product}$$
$$\ce{POO\bullet +\ P\bullet -> cross\ linking\ reaction\ to\ non-radical\ product}$$
$$\ce{P\bullet +\ P\bullet -> cross\ linking\ reaction\ to\ non-radical\ product}$$

Classically the carbon-centred macroradicals (P•) rapidly react with oxygen to form hydroperoxyl radicals (POO•), which in turn abstract an H atom from the polymer chain to give a hydroperoxide (POOH) and a fresh macroradical. Hydroperoxides readily undergo photolysis to give an alkoxyl macroradical radical (PO•) and a hydroxyl radical (HO•), both of which may go on to form new polymer radicals via hydrogen abstraction. Non-classical alternatives to these steps have been proposed. The alkoxyl radical may also undergo beta scission, generating an acyl-ketone and macroradical. This is considered to be the main cause of chain breaking in polypropylene.

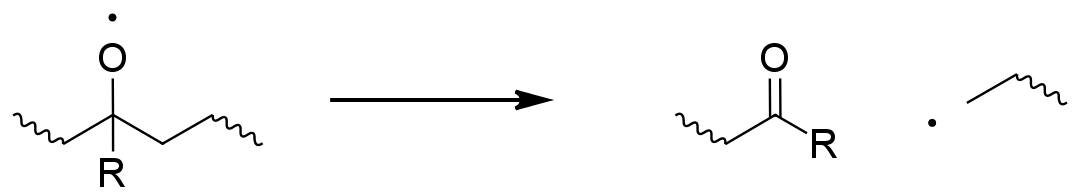

Secondary hydroperoxides can also undergo an intramolecular reaction to give a ketone group, although this is limited to polyethylene.

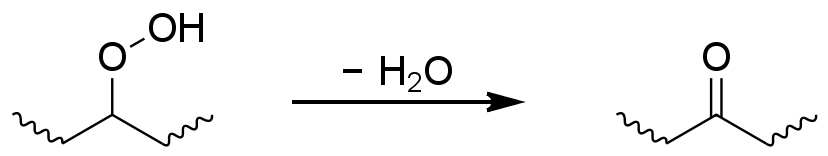

The ketones generated by these processes are themselves photo-active, although much more weakly. At ambient temperatures they undergo Type II Norrish reactions with chain scission. They may also absorb UV-energy, which they can then transfer to O_{2}, causing it to enter its highly reactive singlet state. Singlet oxygen is a potent oxidising agent and can go on to cause further degradation.

=== Polystyrene ===
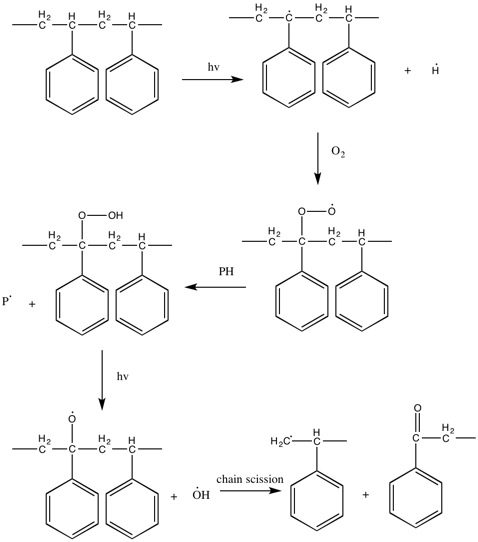
Propagration steps in the degradation of polystyrene

For polystyrene the complete mechanism of photo-oxidation is still a matter of debate, as different pathways may operate concurrently and vary according to the wavelength of the incident light. Regardless, there is agreement on the major steps.

Pure polystyrene should not be able to absorb light with a wavelength below ~280 nm and initiation is explained though photo-labile impurities (hydroperoxides) and charge transfer complexes, all of which are able to absorb normal sunlight. Charge-transfer complexes of oxygen and polystyrene phenyl groups absorb light to form singlet oxygen, which acts as a radical initiator. Carbonyl impurities in the polymer (cf. acetophenone) also absorb light in the near ultraviolet range (300 to 400 nm), forming excited ketones able to abstract hydrogen atoms directly from the polymer. Hyroperoxide undergoes photolysis to form hydroxyl and alkoxyl radicals.

These initiation steps generate macroradicals at tertiary sites, as these are more stabilised. The propagation steps are essentially identical to those seen for polyolefins; with oxidation, hydrogen abstraction and photolysis leading to beta scission reactions and increasing numbers of radicals. These steps account for the majority of chain-breaking, however in a minor pathway the hydroperoxide reacts directly with polymer to form a ketone group (acetophenone) and a terminal alkene without the formation of additional radicals.

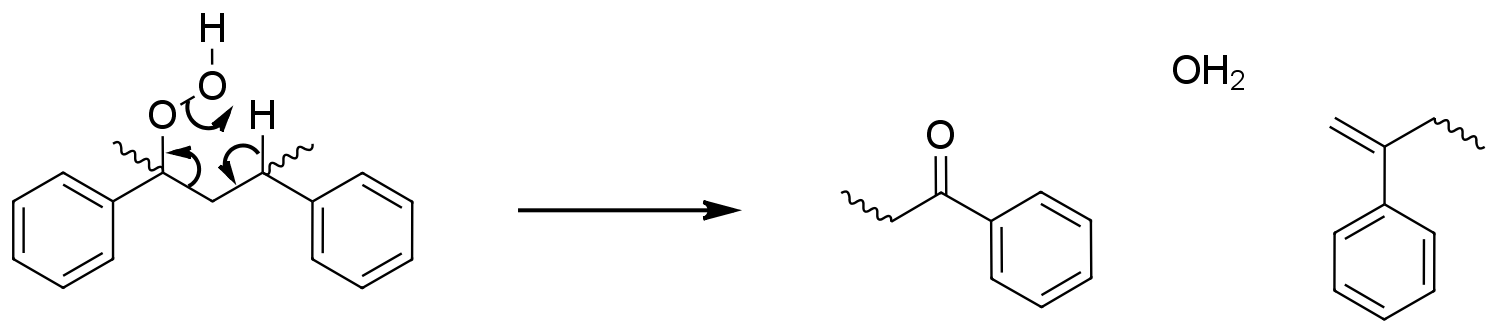

Polystyrene is observed to yellow during photo-oxidation, which is attributed to the formation of polyenes from these terminal alkenes.

=== Polyvinyl chloride (PVC) ===
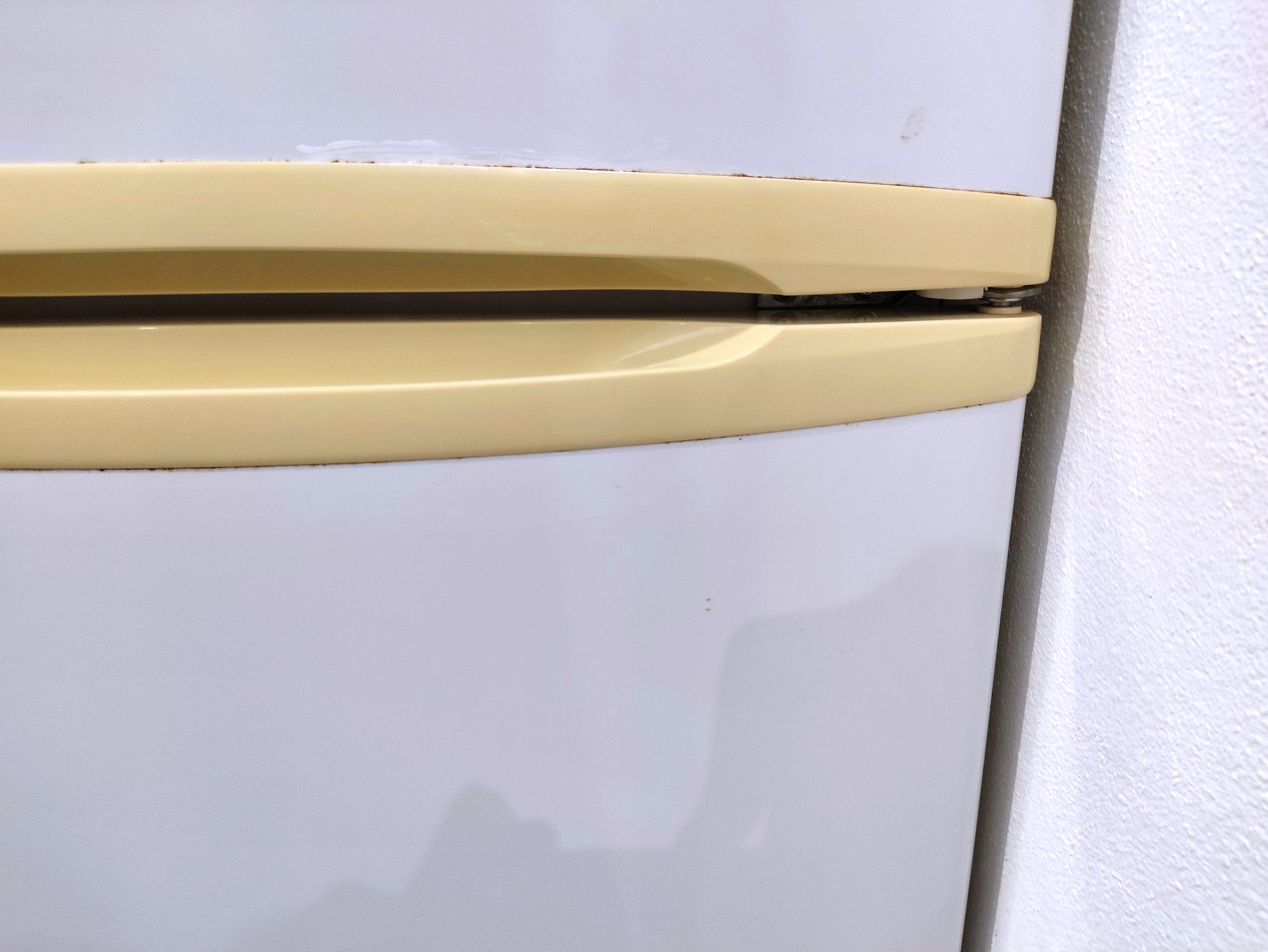
White PVC elements yellowing with age due to UV light exposure causing polymer degradation

Pure organochlorides like polyvinyl chloride (PVC) do not absorb any light above 220 nm. The initiation of photo-oxidation is instead caused by various irregularities in the polymer chain, such as structural defects as well as hydroperoxides, carbonyl groups, and double bonds. Hydroperoxides formed during processing are the most important initiator to begin with, however their concentration decreases during photo-oxidation whereas carbonyl concentration increases, as such carbonyls may become the primary initiator over time.

Propagation steps involve the hydroperoxyl radical, which can abstract hydrogen from both hydrocarbon (-CH_{2}-) and organochloride (-CH_{2}Cl-) sites in the polymer at comparable rates. Radicals formed at hydrocarbon sites rapidly convert to alkenes with loss of radical chlorine. This forms allylic hydrogens (shown in red) which are more susceptible to hydrogen abstraction leading to the formation of polyenes in zipper-like reactions.

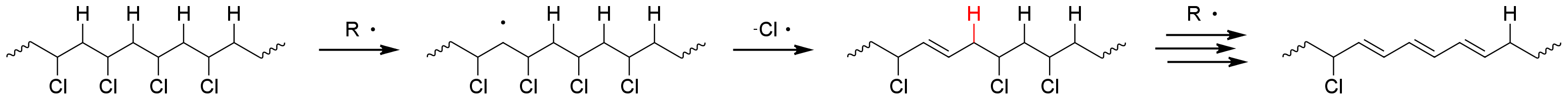

When the polyenes contain at least eight conjugated double bonds they become coloured, leading to yellowing and eventual browning of the material. This is off-set slightly by longer polyenes being photobleached with atmospheric oxygen, however PVC does eventually discolour unless polymer stabilisers are present. Reactions at organochloride sites proceed via the usual hydroperoxyl and hydroperoxide before photolysis yields the α-chloro-alkoxyl radical. This species can undergo various reactions to give carbonyls, peroxide cross-links and beta scission products.

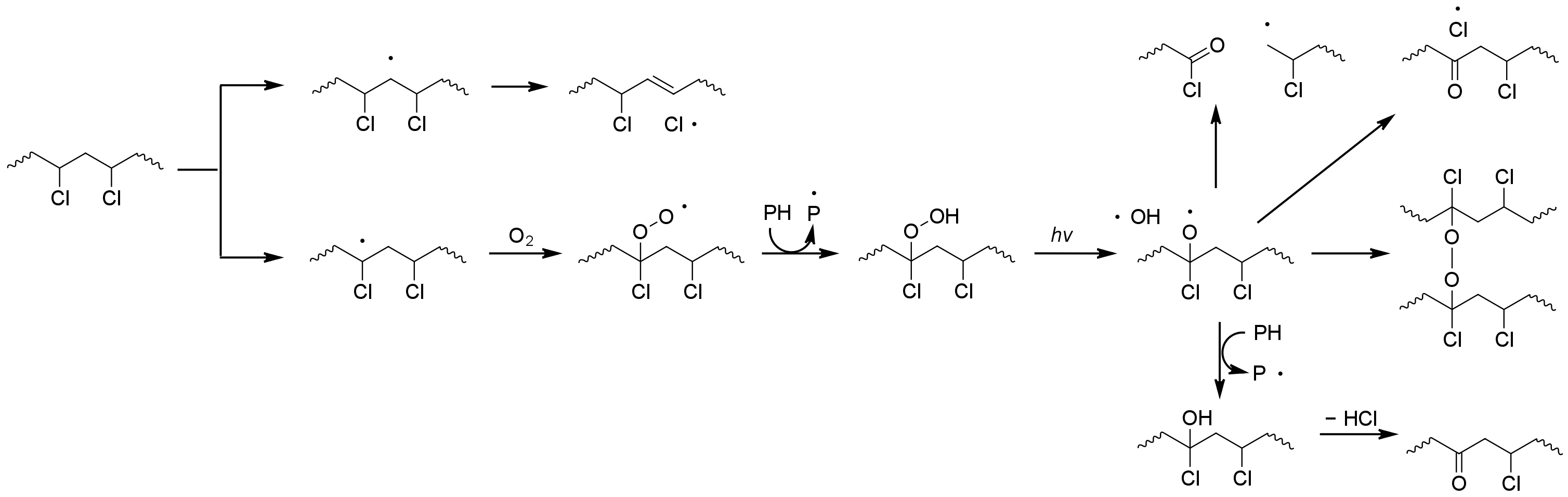
Photo-oxidation of PVC. Fate of the α-chloro-alkoxyl radical (clockwise from top): Beta scission to give either an acid chloride or ketone. Dimerization to give a peroxide cross-link. Hydrogen abstraction followed by loss of HCl to form a ketone.

=== Poly(ethylene terephthalate) - (PET) ===
Unlike most other commodity plastics polyethylene terephthalate (PET) is able to absorb the near ultraviolet rays in sunlight. Absorption begins at 360 nm, becoming stronger below 320 nm and is very significant below 300 nm. Despite this PET has better resistance to photo-oxidation than other commodity plastics, this is due to a poor quantum yield or the absorption. The degradation chemistry is complicated due to simultaneous photodissociation (i.e. not involving oxygen) and photo-oxidation reactions of both the aromatic and aliphatic parts of the molecule. Chain scission is the dominant process, with chain branching and the formation of coloured impurities being less common. Carbon monoxide, carbon dioxide, and carboxylic acids are the main products. The photo-oxidation of other linear polyesters such as polybutylene terephthalate and polyethylene naphthalate proceeds similarly.

Photodissociation involves the formation of an excited terephthalic acid unit which undergoes Norrish reactions. The type I reaction dominates, which cause chain scission at the carbonyl unit to give a range of products.

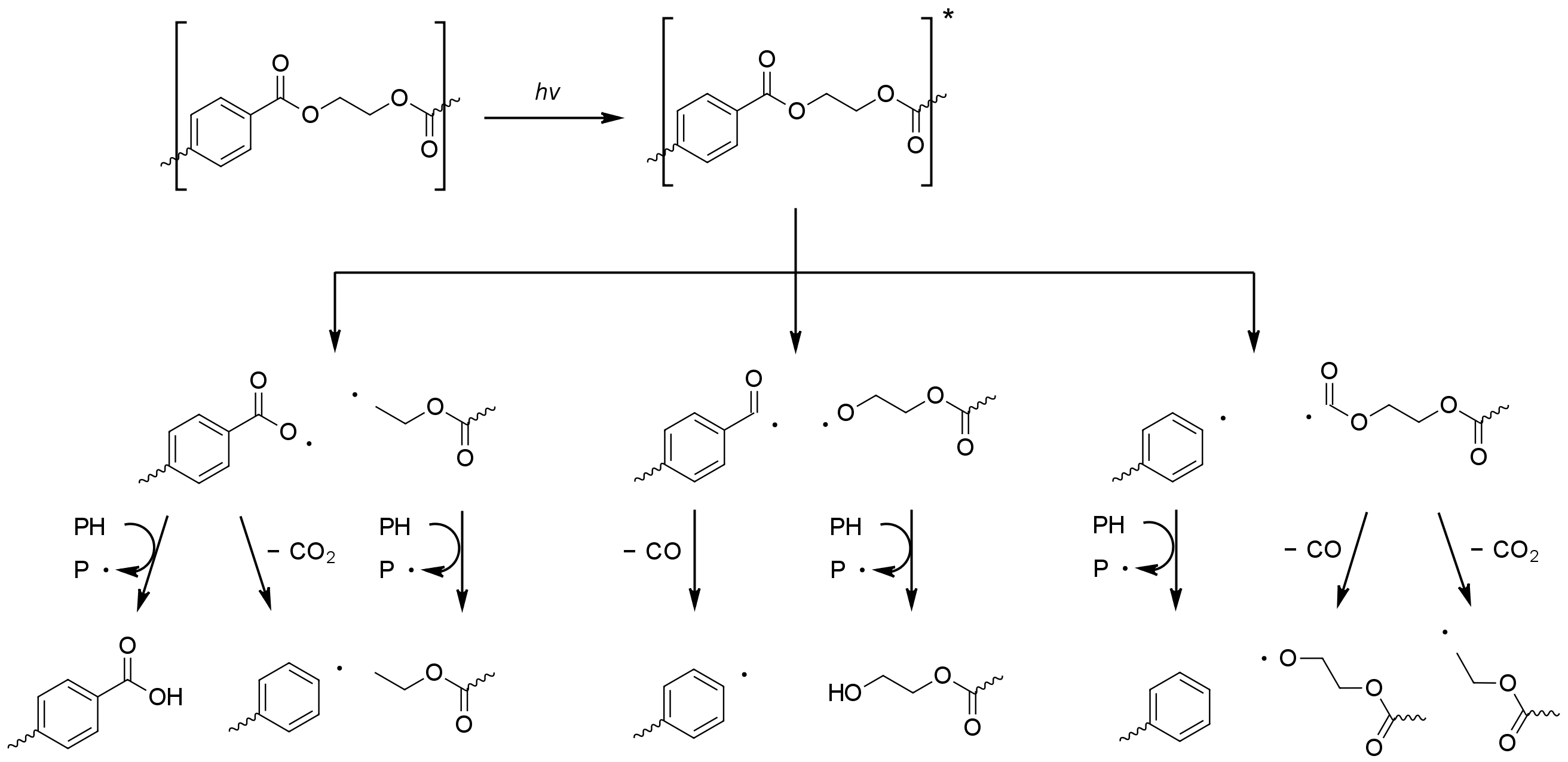

Type II Norrish reactions are less common but give rise to acetaldehyde by way of vinyl alcohol esters. This has an exceedingly low odour and taste threshold and can cause an off-taste in bottled water.

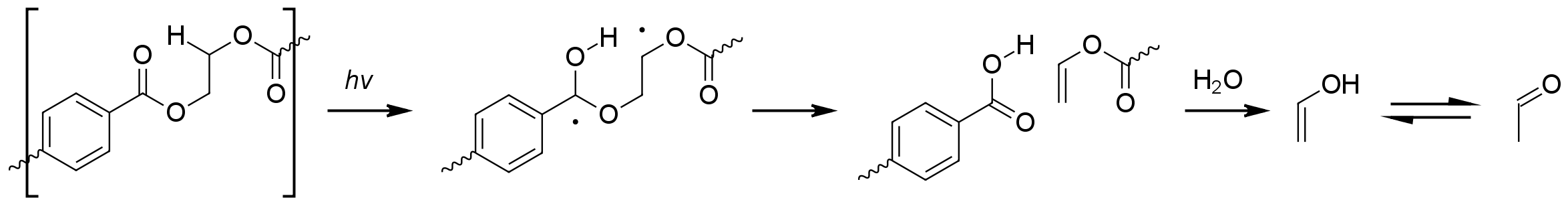

Radicals formed by photolysis may initiate the photo-oxidation in PET. Photo-oxidation of the aromatic terephthalic acid core results in its step-wise oxidation to 2,5-dihydroxyterephthalic acid. The photo-oxidation process at aliphatic sites is similar to that seen for polyolefins, with the formation of hydroperoxide species eventually leading to beta-scission of the polymer chain.

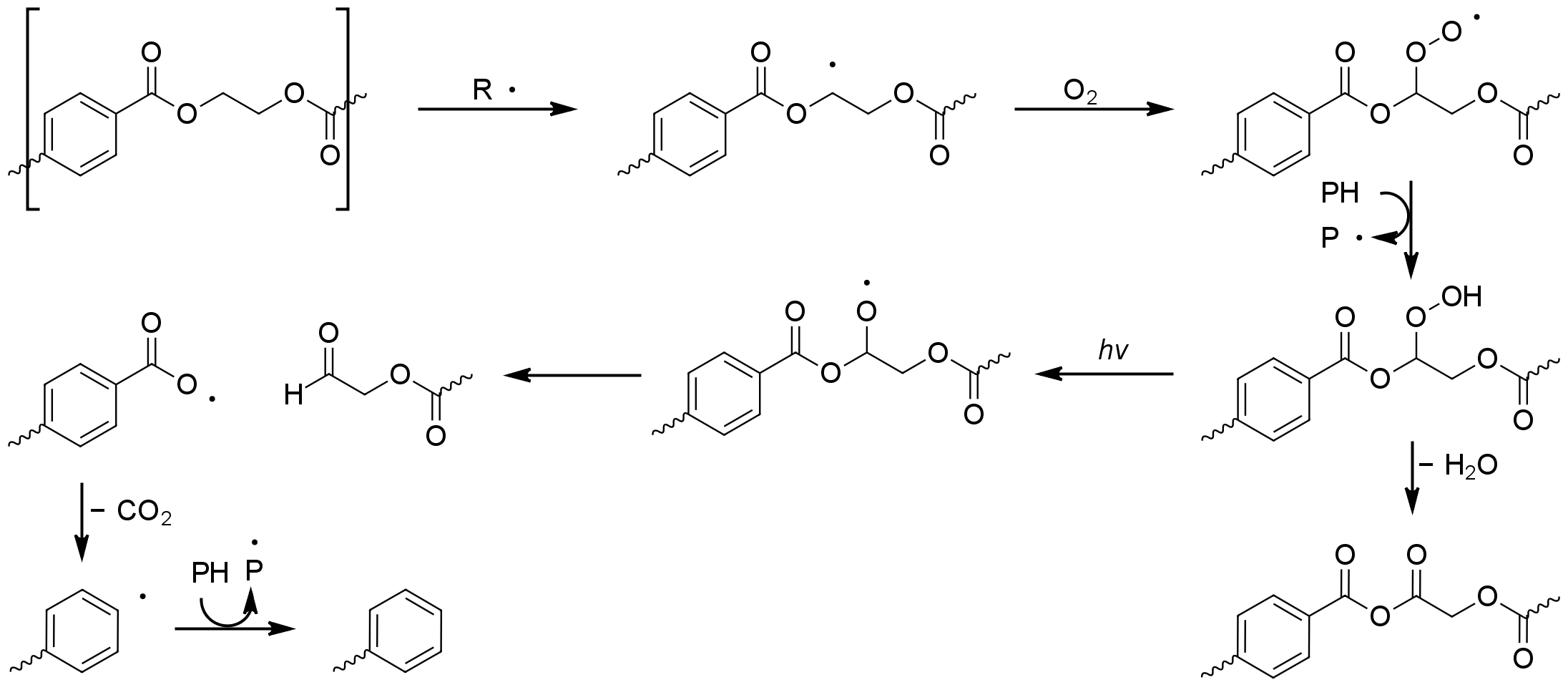

== Secondary factors ==
=== Environment ===
Perhaps surprisingly, the effect of temperature is often greater than the effect of UV exposure. This can be seen in terms of the Arrhenius equation, which shows that reaction rates have an exponential dependence on temperature. By comparison the dependence of degradation rate on UV exposure and the availability of oxygen is broadly linear. As the oceans are cooler than land plastic pollution in the marine environment degrades more slowly. Materials buried in landfill do not degrade by photo-oxidation at all, though they may gradually decay by other processes.

Mechanical stress can effect the rate of photo-oxidation and may also accelerate the physical breakup of plastic objects. Stress can be caused by mechanical load (tensile and shear stresses) or even by temperature cycling, particularly in composite systems consisting of materials with differing temperature coefficients of expansion. Similarly, sudden rainfall can cause thermal stress.

=== Effects of dyes and other additives ===
Dyes and pigments are used in polymer materials to provide colour, however they can also affect the rate of photo-oxidation. Many absorb UV rays and in so doing protect the polymer, however absorption can cause the dyes to enter an excited state where they may attack the polymer or transfer energy to O_{2} to form damaging singlet oxygen. Cu-phthalocyanine is an example, it strongly absorbs UV light however the excited Cu-phthalocyanine may act as a photoinitiator by abstracting hydrogen atoms from the polymer. Its interactions may become even more complicated when other additives are present. Fillers such as carbon black can screen out UV light, effectively stabilisers the polymer, whereas flame retardants tend to cause increased levels of photo-oxidation.

== Additives to enhance degradation ==
Biodegradable additives may be added to polymers to accelerate their degradation. In the case of photo-oxidation OXO-biodegradation additives are used. These are transition metal salts such as iron (Fe), manganese (Mn), and cobalt (Co). Fe complexes increase the rate of photooxidation by promoting the homolysis of hydroperoxides via Fenton reactions.

The use of such additives has been controversial due to concerns that treated plastics do not fully biodegrade and instead result in the accelerated formation of microplastics. Oxo-plastics would be difficult to distinguish from untreated plastic but their inclusion during plastic recycling can create a destabilised product with fewer potential uses, potentially jeopardising the business case for recycling any plastic. OXO-biodegradation additives were banned in the EU in 2019

== Prevention ==
Bisoctrizole: A phenolic benzotriazole based UV absorber used to protect polymers

Active principle of the ultraviolet absorption via a photochromic transition

UV attack by sunlight can be ameliorated or prevented by adding anti-UV polymer stabilizers, usually prior to shaping the product by injection moulding. UV stabilizers in plastics usually act by absorbing the UV radiation preferentially, and dissipating the energy as low-level heat. The chemicals used are similar to those in sunscreen products, which protect skin from UV attack. They are used frequently in plastics, including cosmetics and films. Different UV stabilizers are utilized depending upon the substrate, intended functional life, and sensitivity to UV degradation. UV stabilizers, such as benzophenones, work by absorbing the UV radiation and preventing the formation of free radicals. Depending upon substitution, the UV absorption spectrum is changed to match the application. Concentrations normally range from 0.05% to 2%, with some applications up to 5%.

Frequently, glass can be a better alternative to polymers when it comes to UV degradation. Most of the commonly used glass types are highly resistant to UV radiation. Explosion protection lamps for oil rigs for example can be made either from polymer or glass. Here, the UV radiation and rough weathers belabor the polymer so much, that the material has to be replaced frequently.

Poly(ethylene-naphthalate) (PEN) can be protected by applying a zinc oxide coating, which acts as protective film reducing the diffusion of oxygen. Zinc oxide can also be used on polycarbonate (PC) to decrease the oxidation and photo-yellowing rate caused by solar radiation.

== Analysis ==
=== Weather testing of polymers ===
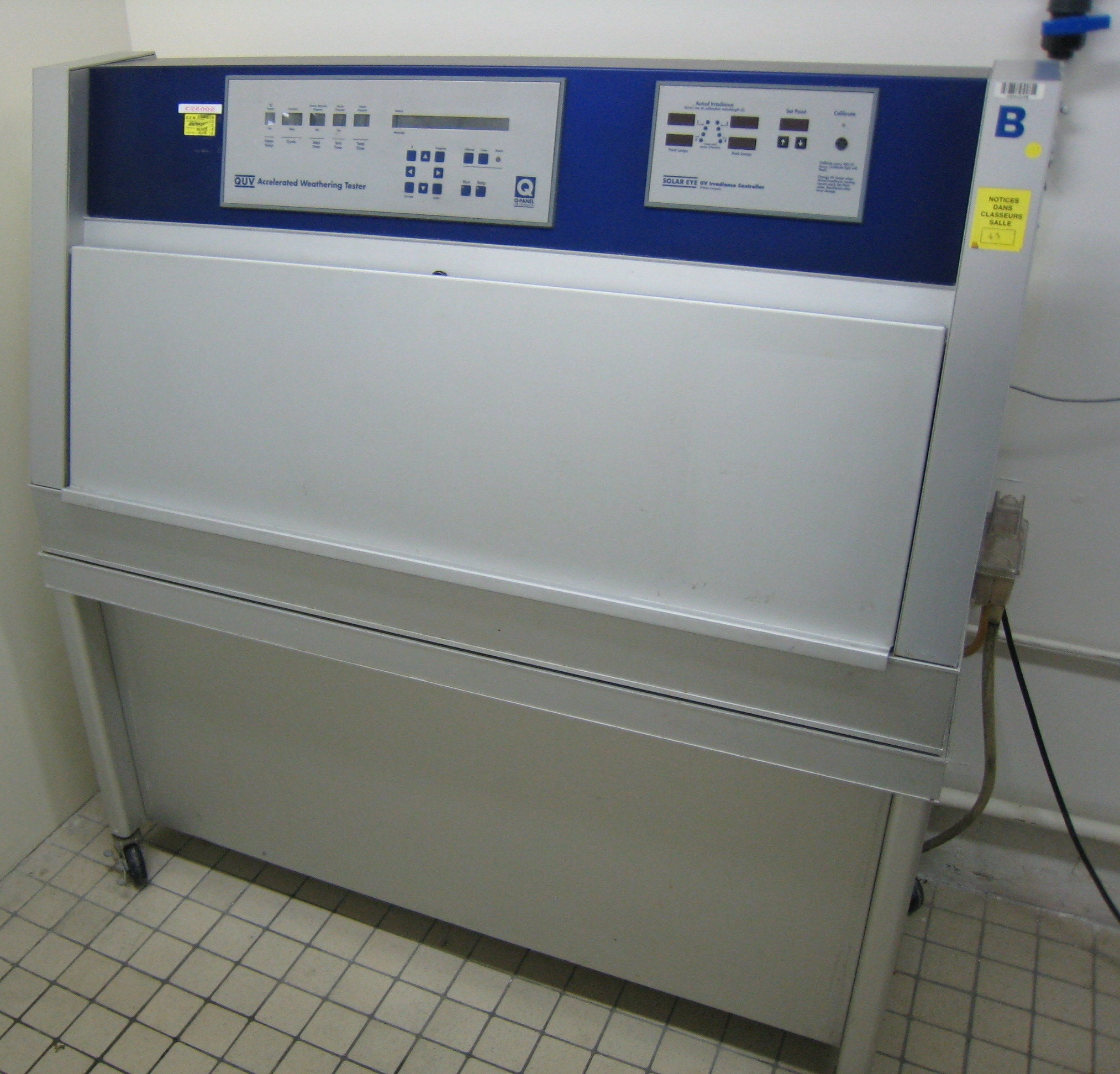
An accelerated weathering tester, a type of environmental chamber. It exposes materials to alternating cycles of UV light and moisture at elevated temperatures (at T≈60 °C for example), simulating the effects of sunlight, and dew and rain. This is used to test the yellowing of coatings (such as white paints).

The photo-oxidation of polymers can be investigated by either natural or accelerated weather testing. Such testing is important in determining the expected service-life of plastic items as well as the fate of waste plastic.

In natural weather testing, polymer samples are directly exposed to open weather for a continuous period of time, while accelerated weather testing uses a specialized test chamber which simulates weathering by sending a controlled amount of UV light and water at a sample. A test chamber may be advantageous in that the exact weathering conditions can be controlled, and the UV or moisture conditions can be made more intense than in natural weathering. Thus, degradation is accelerated and the test is less time-consuming.

Through weather testing, the impact of photooxidative processes on the mechanical properties and lifetimes of polymer samples can be determined. For example, the tensile behavior can be elucidated through measuring the stress–strain curve for a specimen. This stress–strain curve is created by applying a tensile stress (which is measured as the force per area applied to a sample face) and measuring the corresponding strain (the fractional change in length). Stress is usually applied until the material fractures, and from this stress–strain curve, mechanical properties such as the Young's modulus can be determined. Overall, weathering weakens the sample, and as it becomes more brittle, it fractures more easily. This is observed as a decrease in the yield strain, fracture strain, and toughness, as well as an increase in the Young's modulus and break stress (the stress at which the material fractures).

Aside from measuring the impact of degradation on mechanical properties, the degradation rate of plastic samples can also be quantified by measuring the change in mass of a sample over time, as microplastic fragments can break off from the bulk material as degradation progresses and the material becomes more brittle through chain-scission. Thus, the percentage change in mass is often measured in experiments to quantify degradation.

Mathematical models can also be created to predict the change in mass of a polymer sample over the weathering process. Because mass loss occurs at the surface of the polymer sample, the degradation rate is dependent on surface area. Thus, a model for the dependence of degradation on surface area can be made by assuming that the rate of change in mass $-{\operatorname{d}\!m\over\operatorname{d}\!t}$ resulting from degradation is directly proportional to the surface area SA of the specimen:

$-{\operatorname{d}\!m\over\operatorname{d}\!t}=k_d\rho SA$

Here, $\rho$ is the density and k_{d} is known as the specific surface degradation rate (SSDR), which changes depending on the polymer sample's chemical composition and weathering environment. Furthermore, for a microplastic sample, SA is often approximated as the surface area of a cylinder or sphere. Such an equation can be solved to determine the mass of a polymer sample as a function of time.

=== Detection ===
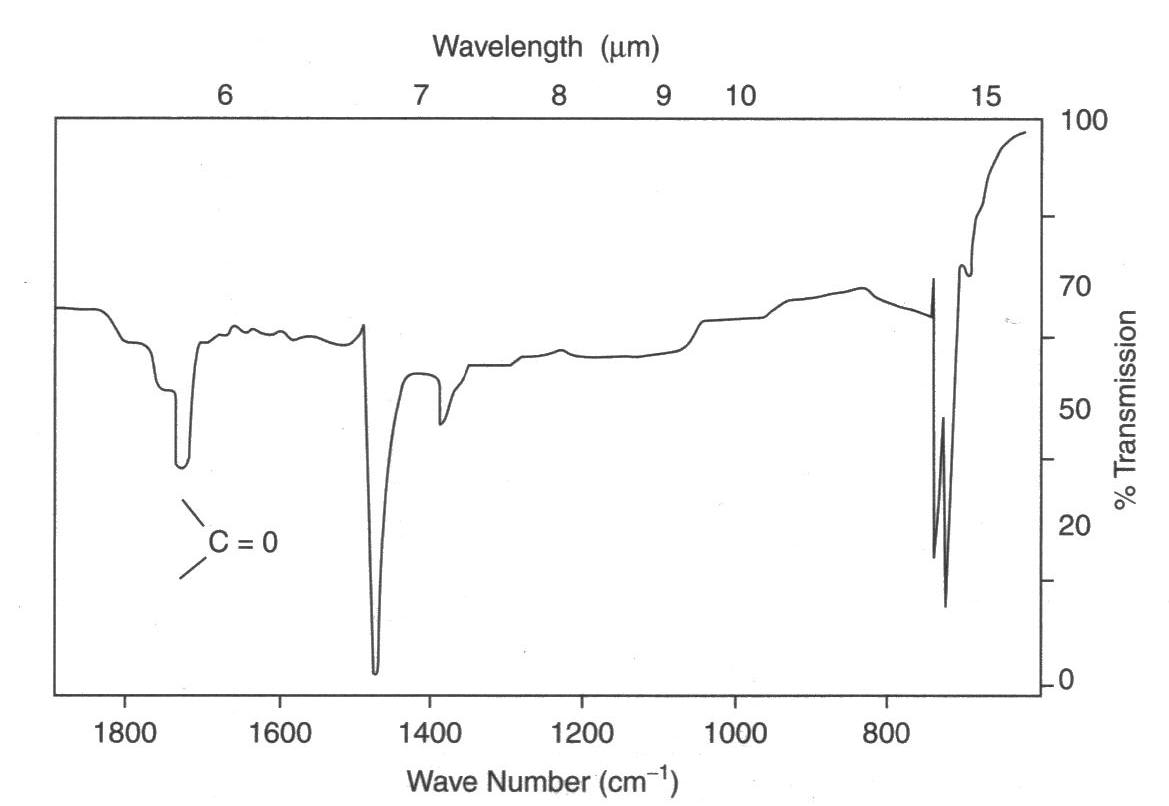
IR spectrum showing carbonyl absorption due to UV degradation of polyethylene

Degradation can be detected before serious cracks are seen in a product by using infrared spectroscopy, which is able to detect chemical species formed by photo-oxidation. In particular, peroxy-species and carbonyl groups have distinct absorption bands.

In the example shown at left, carbonyl groups were easily detected by IR spectroscopy from a cast thin film. The product was a road cone made by rotational moulding in LDPE, which had cracked prematurely in service. Many similar cones also failed because an anti-UV additive had not been used during processing. Other plastic products which failed included polypropylene mancabs used at roadworks which cracked after service of only a few months.

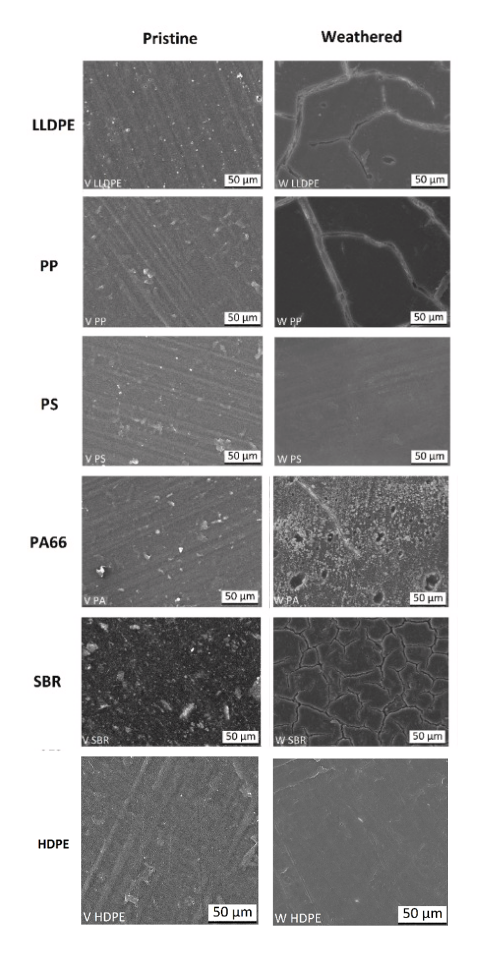
Different polymer samples are visualized using a scanning electron microscope before and after weathering. Included polymers are low-density polyethylene (LDPE), polypropylene (PP), polystyrene (PS), polyamide 66 (PA66), styrene butadiene rubber (SBR), and high-density polyethylene (HDPE).

The effects of degradation can also be characterized through scanning electron microscopy (SEM). For example, through SEM, defects like cracks and pits can be directly visualized, as shown at right. These samples were exposed to 840 hours of exposure to UV light and moisture using a test chamber. Crack formation is often associated with degradation, such that materials that do not display significant cracking behavior, such as HDPE in the right example, are more likely to be stable against photooxidation compared to other materials like LDPE and PP. However, some plastics that have undergone photooxidation may also appear smoother in an SEM image, with some defects like grooves having disappeared afterwards. This is seen in polystyrene in the right example.

== See also ==
- Forensic polymer engineering
- Photodegradation
- Polymer degradation
- Stress corrosion cracking
- Thermal degradation of polymers
