= National Centre for the Evaluation of Photoprotection =

The National Centre for Evaluation of Photoprotection (NCEP), also known as the National Institute for Evaluation of Photoprotection, is a French research center dedicated to the study and analysis of plastic materials, including the identification of failed mechanisms and the study of material durability.

== Overview ==
The center's research specializes in improving the safety and efficacy of plastics. Key methods include conducting physicochemical analyses to determine the causes of material failures. A significant part of this process involves the use of both artificial and natural aging tests to predict the long-term performance and stability of these materials. This research plays an essential role in enhancing the reliability and safety of polymer-based products, including nanocomposite and composite materials with polymer matrices.

== History ==
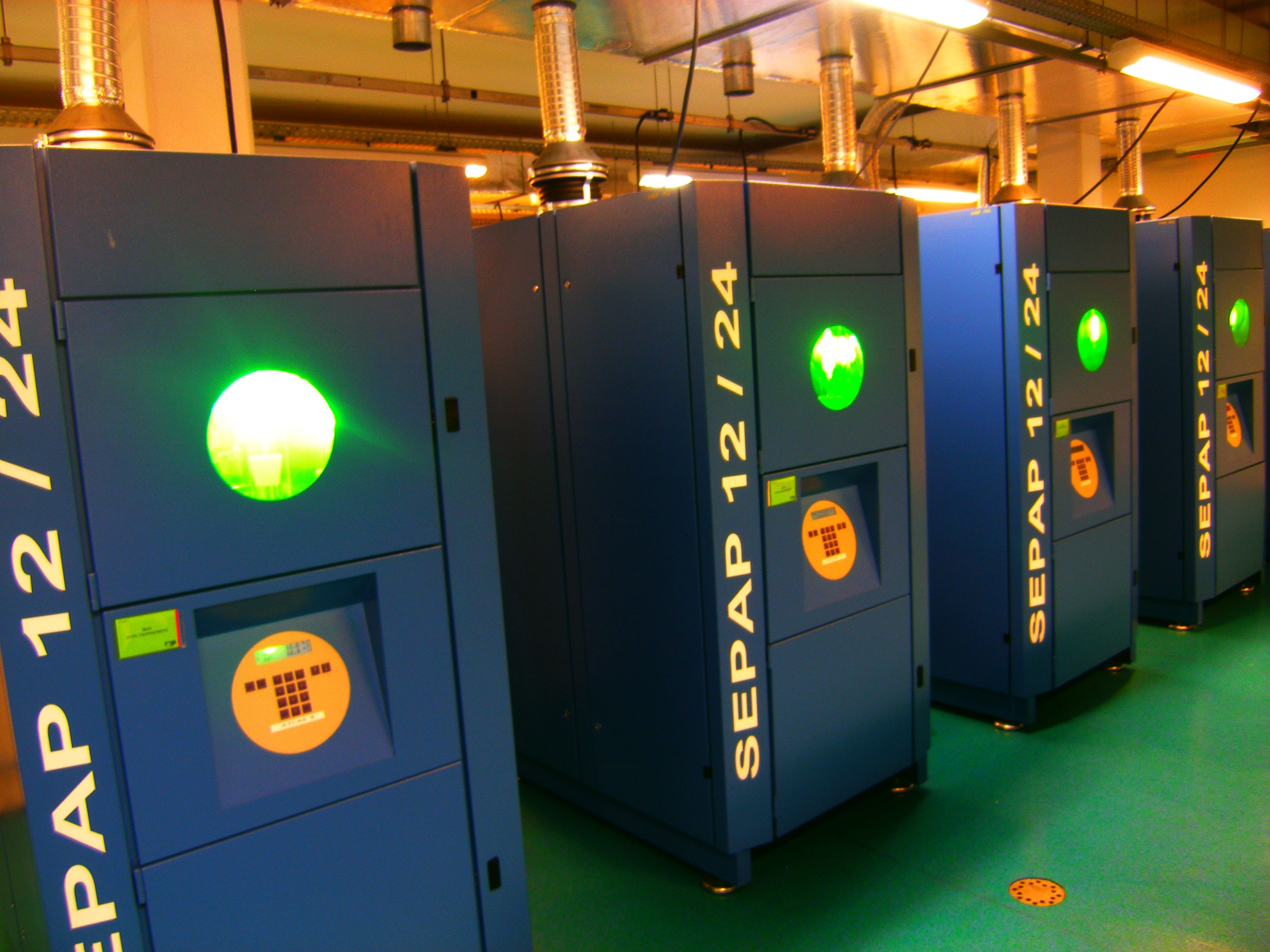
A photo of SEPAP weather testers in CNEP

The National Institute for the Evaluation of Photoprotection is a subsidiary of Blaise Pascal University and was created in 1986 by Professor Jacques Lemaire, former head of the Laboratory of Molecular and Macromolecular Photochemistry (LPMM) . The center's initial objective was to transfer LPMM's research on polymer photoaging to industrial companies facing increasing problems of plastic degradation, such as yellowing and bleaching.

The center is associated both with the LPMM and companies in the field of polymer applications. NCEP employs tools for the physicochemical analysis of polymer material degradation such as infrared and UV-visible spectroscopy, and serves as an interface between polymer producers, transformers, and constructors. Additionally, NCEP carries out the Papylum Project to develop expertise in the analysis and primarily restoration of organic material involved in works of art as well as the determination of common initial properties of polymers.

== See also ==
- Plastics
- Nanocomposite
- Composite materials
- Polymer
- Oxidation
- Polymer degradation
- Quality control
- Standardization
- Photochemistry
- Weather testing of polymers
- fr:Photovieillissement accéléré en SEPAP (French)
- Weathering
