= Phototendering =

Degrading of materials exposed to sunlight

Phototendering is the process by which organic fibres and textiles lose strength and flexibility due to exposure to sunlight. The ultraviolet component of the sun's spectrum affects fibres, causing chain degradation and, hence, loss of strength. Colour fade is a common problem in phototendering.

== UV degradation ==
The rate of deterioration is also affected by pigments and dyes present in the textiles. Pigments can also be affected, generally fading after UVA and UVB radiation exposure. Great care is needed to preserve museum artefacts, such as ancient textiles, from the harmful effects of UV light, which can also be present in fluorescent lamps. Paintings such as watercolours need protection from sunlight to preserve the original colours.

Many synthetic polymers are also degraded by UV light, and polypropylene is especially susceptible. As a result, UV stabilisers are added to many thermoplastics. Ultraviolet absorbers such as carbon black are also effective in protecting products against UV degradation.

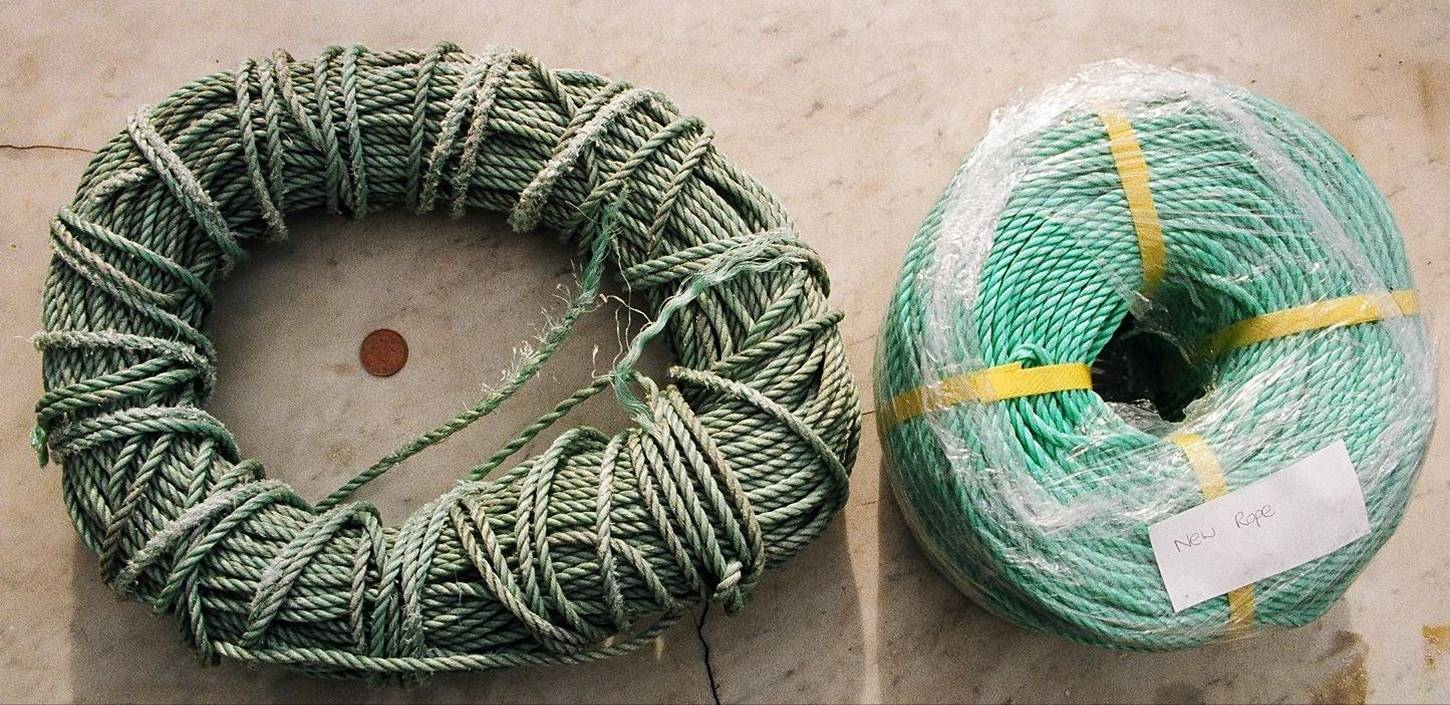
Effect of UV exposure on polypropylene rope

== See also ==
- Polymer degradation
- UV Stabilizers in plastics
