= Weather testing of polymers =

Controlled polymer and polymer coating degradation

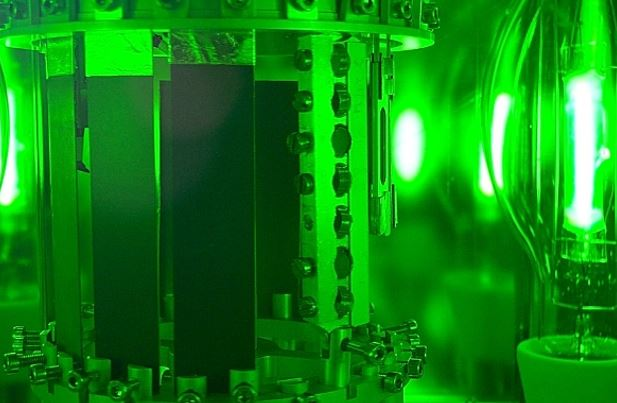
Detail of the inside of SEPAP 12-24 Unit (4 lamps)

Accelerated photo-ageing of polymers in SEPAP units is the controlled polymer degradation and polymer coating degradation under lab or natural conditions.

The prediction of the ageing of plastic materials is a subject that concerns both users and manufacturers. It covers plastic materials (polymers, fillers and various additives) or intermediates that are the transformers that use their thermoplastic property for the manufacture of objects by processes such as extrusion, injection molding, etc.

The reliability of the materials is one of the many guarantees that are increasingly required for all the manufactured objects. It can be integrated into the "sustainable development" approach. However, predicting the behavior of a material or an industrial part over time is a delicate process because many parameters must be taken into account.

The resistance to "natural" ageing itself is variable. It depends on temperature, sunshine (climate, latitude, humidity, ...) and on many other factors (physical constraints, level of pollution, ...) that are difficult to assess accurately. The simulation of this ageing by the use of artificial light sources and other physical constraints (temperature, sprinkling of water simulating rain, ...) has been the subject of developments that are the basis of several standards, ISO, ASTM, etc.

After all, accelerating this ageing to offer, for example, ten-year guarantees or validate stabilizing agents is a complex approach that must be based on solid science. Other applications, such as those of materials that must degrade quickly in the environment, are also concerned by this approach.

== Mechanistic approach ==
It has long been known that most ageing of these materials is based on a chemical reaction called "radical oxidation". Under the influence of external stresses that generate primary radicals attacking chemical bonds (especially the most abundant ones, between carbon and hydrogen), reactions occur with atmospheric oxygen. This led to the formation of many chemical entities, among which hydroperoxides and peroxides were the key products; they are both stable enough to be detected and reactive enough to break down into many by-products such as ketones, alcohols, acids, ... which are easily detectable by spectroscopic methods. Another important element, the decomposition of one of these peroxidized groups (like hydrogen peroxide, H_{2}O_{2}) generates two new radicals, which leads to a self-acceleration of ageing.

These elementary chemical reactions lead more or less quickly to a deterioration of the physical properties of polymer materials and their precise analysis using infrared spectroscopy methods makes it possible both to understand the degradation mechanism and to make predictions about the long-term behavior of polymers.

Polypropylene, a common material in our everyday environment, is a very significant example of this approach. Its chemical structure where many tertiary carbons are present (bound to three carbon atoms and only one hydrogen) makes it a particularly sensitive material to ageing. Its use in the absence of stabilizing agents, in the form of film for example, is completely impossible without finding degradation (in a few days it quickly becomes opaque and brittle).

== Photo-ageing of polymers ==
Sunlight (whose wavelengths on earth are greater than 295 nm) is among the main factors affecting the natural ageing of plastics along with temperature and atmospheric oxygen. However, if the influence of temperature can be analyzed separately (ageing in the dark), it is not the same for photo-ageing which is always associated with a temperature effect, it is also often rightly qualified as "photo-thermal".

The simulation of photothermal ageing is generally done by exposing samples in centers approved for their geographical location (Arizona, Florida, South of France) and their ability to know precisely the exposure conditions (duration and intensity of sunshine, temperature, humidity level, etc.). Sometimes mirror systems make it possible to intensify the radiation. The simulation can also be carried out in the laboratory, we generally use xenon lamps whose spectrum, after eliminating short wavelengths, is very similar to that of the sun. Most instruments allow control of light intensity, temperature of the surrounding environment, humidity level and water sprinklers can be programmed to simulate the effect of rain.

The use of xenon lamps is based on a similarity with the solar spectrum but that the principles of photochemistry (in particular the existence of vibrational relaxations of excited states) do not exclude the use of other light sources to simulate or accelerate photothermal ageing. Mercury-vapor lamps, properly filtered, have a discontinuous spectrum with discrete radiations (unlike the spectra of xenon and the sun which are continuous). This UV emission of Hg lamps also makes it possible to predict the durability of polymer materials formulated under use.

== SEPAP accelerated artificial photo-ageing units ==
As early as 1978, the principles mentioned above led to the design of specific units by the Laboratory of Molecular and Macromolecular Photochemistry, now integrated into the Institute of Chemistry of Clermont-Ferrand (https://iccf.uca.fr). One of these units, referenced SEPAP 12–24, was long built and marketed by ATLAS MTT (picture 1) until the release of a new SEPAP MHE model in 2014 (picture 2) (https://www.atlas-mts.com).

In the SEPAP 12-24 unit, light excitation is provided by four 400 Watts medium-pressure mercury vapor lamps placed at the four corners of a parallelepiped. These lamps, whose shortest wavelengths are eliminated by a borosilicate glass envelope, have lifetime of 5000 hours. The temperature of the exposed surfaces (and not of the surrounding environment) is maintained and controlled by a thermoprobe in contact with a reference film of the same composition as the samples to be exposed. This temperature can vary from 45 °C to 80 °C and a good compromise between photochemical excitation and thermal excitation is always ensured at the level of the samples. 24 samples of about 1X5 cm are positioned on a metallic sample holder rotating at a constant speed in the center of the unit to ensure homogeneous illumination of all samples. The sample size is suitable for monitoring chemical evolution, with a low conversion rate, by infrared spectroscopy. SEPAP 12-24 enclosures must be calibrated using polyethylene calibration films. The detailed analysis of the mechanism of chemical evolution that controls degradation could be proposed for a large number of polymers [3,4] and it could be verified that this mechanism was identical to that which intervened in natural ageing on approved site or during real outdoor use. Today, a dozen French and European standards refer to these enclosures (agricultural films, cables) and about twenty companies have included SEPAP tests in their specifications for their subcontractors.

The new SEPAP MHE (Medium and High Energy) unit is equipped with a single medium-pressure mercury source with variable power allowing a first level of acceleration corresponding to that of the SEPAP 12-24 unit and a second level allowing an acceleration about 3 times higher (Ultra-Acceleration). It was developed by CNEP, Renault, PSA, PolyOne and Atlas-Ametek. The source has a central position and the samples are fixed on a sample holder animated by a uniform rotational movement around the source.

The analysis of the chemical evolution under the accelerated conditions of a SEPAP 12-24 or MHE units and the analysis of the chemical evolution in an early phase of exposure in outdoor use in the field (1 year or more) make it possible to define an acceleration factor if we know how to discern in the mechanism the formation of a "critical product" representative of the reaction pattern. This acceleration factor cannot be universal for all families of formulated materials that evolve according to very different reaction mechanisms, but it can be determined for each family of polymers. For example, it is close to 12 (1 month = 1 year in the field in the South of France) for the reference polyethylene. These acceleration factors have indeed been determined in very specific cases of polymers of well-defined formulations and exposed in forms that allow to take into account the diffusion of oxygen (avoid any oxygen starvation) and the migrations of stabilizers ("reservoir" effect).

The SEPAP MHE unit allows, for example, to simulate a year of exposure of a polypropylene in the south of France in 300 hours (on average acceleration) or 100 hours (in ultra-acceleration mode).

== Medium and Ultra-acceleration ==
Can photo-ageing be further accelerated? There are many ways to achieve this, but there is a great risk of no longer being representative of natural ageing. From the photochemical point of view, multi-photonic effects are for example to be feared, just as the oxygen starvation may occur very quickly and strongly disrupt the degradation mechanisms. The ultra-accelerated approach developed in the SEPAP MHE unit makes it possible to solve in particular the problem of very long-term stability required for certain applications (cable-stayed bridges, photovoltaic panels, wind turbines, ...) or the need to be able to homologate a new material very quickly (automotive industry, ...).

== Role of water ==
It is first of all its physical role (leaching) that has been highlighted in particular in polyolefins (polyethylene, polypropylene). Polar degradation products and low molecular weights can be removed from the surface of the material and thus mask the ageing phenomenon. It is possible to operate the SEPAP MHE with periodic sprinklers of water by avoiding too abundant sprinkling that can lead to an underestimation of ageing. Too frequent water sprinkling can also lead to premature extraction of low molecular weight stabilizers and wrongly disqualify polymeric materials.

To examine the combined role of water with other physico-chemical constraints (Ultraviolet – heat – oxygen), a prototype SEPAP 12-24 H unit was developed. In this unit the sample holder is immersed in temperature-controlled liquid water that is re-oxygenated in outdoor circulation.

== Centre National d'Evaluation de Photoprotection (called CNEP) ==
In 1986, the work of the Laboratory of Molecular and Macromolecular Photochemistry led to the creation of a transfer center CNEP to put its skills in the photo-ageing of polymer materials at the service of manufacturers, either to analyze failures of their materials or to conduct studies of collective interest.

Studies to predict the behavior of polymeric materials subjected to different environmental constraints (sunlight, heat with or without moisture) or failure analyses of polymer parts can be carried out in collaboration with the R&D departments of manufacturers. The CNEP can also be a partner in collaborative projects led by industrialists on an innovative research theme.

The Centre National d'Evaluation de Photoprotection is now associated with about sixty companies and annually carries out more than 450 studies covering all areas of application of polymers including works of art. It is also approved at the French national level as a "Technological Resources Center".

== Notes and references ==
1. Jacques Lacoste, Sandrine Therias, '’Vieillissement des matériaux polymères et des composites'’ in L'actualité chimique, 2015, 395, 38-43.
2. Jacques Lacoste, David Carlsson,"Gamma-, photo-, and thermally-initiated oxidation of linear low density polyethylene: a quantitative comparison of oxidation products" in J. Polym. Sci., Polym. Chem. Ed. A, 1992, 30, 493-500 and 1993, 31, 715-722 (polypropylène)
3. Jacques Lemaire,"Predicting polymer durability" in Chemtech, October 1996, 42- 47
4. Jacques Lemaire, René Arnaud, Jean Luc Gardette, Jacques Lacoste, Henri Seinera, "Zuverlässigkeit der methode der photo-schnellalterung bei polymeren. ( Reliability of the accelerated photo-ageing method)", Kunststoffe, German Plastics (int Ed.), 1986, 76, 149-153

== See also ==
- Polymer degradation – Alteration in the polymer properties under the influence of environmental factors
- Ultraviolet – Energetic, invisible radiant energy range
- UV degradation – Phenomenon in chemistry
- Gas-discharge lamp – Artificial light sources powered by ionized gas electric discharge
- Electric arc – Electrical breakdown of a gas that results in an ongoing electrical discharge
- Fluorescent lamps – Lamp using fluorescence to produce light
- Mercury-vapor lamps – Light source using an electric arc through mercury vapor
- National Centre for the Evaluation of Photoprotection
- Photo-oxidation of polymers – Phenomenon in chemistry
