= Chain scission =

Chemical reaction that cuts a polymer

IUPAC definition

chain scission: A chemical reaction resulting in the breaking of skeletal bond.

Chain scission is a term used in polymer chemistry describing the degradation of a polymer main chain. It is often caused by thermal stress (heat) or ionizing radiation (e.g. light, UV radiation or gamma radiation), often involving oxygen. During chain cleavage, the polymer chain is broken at a random point in the backbone to form two—mostly still highly molecular—fragments.

Depolymerization, on the other hand, is the elimination of low molecular weight substances (monomers, dimers and suchlike) from a polymer.
