= Beta scission =

Chemical reaction

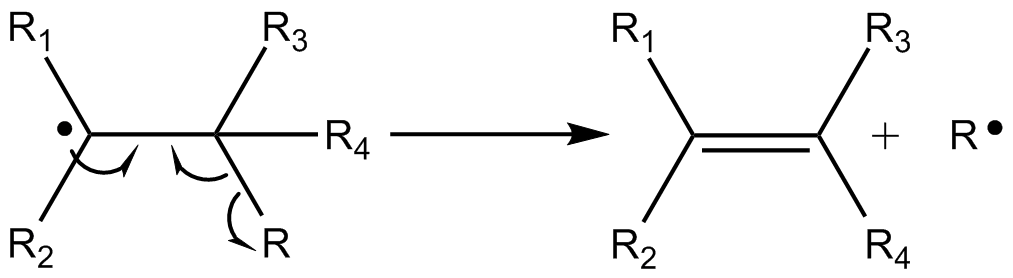
Beta scission reaction

Beta scission is an important reaction in the chemistry of thermal cracking of hydrocarbons and the formation of free radicals. Free radicals are formed upon splitting the carbon-carbon bond. Free radicals are extremely reactive and short-lived. When a free radical in a polymer chain undergoes a beta scission, the free radical breaks two carbons away from the charged carbon producing an olefin (ethylene) and a primary free radical, which has two fewer carbon atoms.

In organic synthesis, beta scission can be used to direct multistep radical transformations. For example, beta-scission of a weak C-S bond was used to favor one of two equilibrating radicals in metal free conversion of phenols to aromatic esters and acids via C-O transposition.
