= Preservative =

Substance designed to prevent decomposition

A preservative is a substance or a chemical that is added to products such as food products, beverages, pharmaceutical drugs, paints, biological samples, cosmetics, wood, and many other products to prevent decomposition by microbial growth or by undesirable chemical changes. In general, preservation is implemented in two modes, chemical and physical. Chemical preservation entails adding chemical compounds to the product. Physical preservation entails processes such as refrigeration or drying. Preservative food additives reduce the risk of foodborne infections, decrease microbial spoilage, and preserve fresh attributes and nutritional quality. Some physical techniques for food preservation include dehydration, UV-C radiation, freeze-drying, and refrigeration. Chemical preservation and physical preservation techniques are sometimes combined.

== Food preservation ==
Preservatives have been used since prehistoric times. Smoked meat for example has phenols and other chemicals that delay spoilage. The preservation of foods has evolved greatly over the centuries and has been instrumental in increasing food security. Historically foods were preserved using traditional oils, salting, drying, and smoking methods. The use of chemical preservatives in food began in the late 19th century, but was not widespread until the 20th century.

The use of food preservatives varies greatly depending on the country. Many developing countries that do not have strong governments to regulate food additives face either harmful levels of preservatives in foods or a complete avoidance of foods that are considered unnatural or foreign. These countries have also proven useful in case studies surrounding chemical preservatives, as they have been only recently introduced. In urban slums of highly populated countries, the knowledge about contents of food tends to be extremely low, despite consumption of these imported foods.

=== Antimicrobial preservatives ===
Antimicrobial preservatives prevent degradation by bacteria. This method is the most traditional and ancient type of preserving—ancient methods such as pickling and adding honey prevent microorganism growth by modifying the pH level. The most commonly used antimicrobial preservative is lactic acid. Common antimicrobial preservatives are presented in the table. Nitrates and nitrites are also antimicrobial. The detailed mechanism of these chemical compounds range from inhibiting growth of the bacteria to the inhibition of specific enzymes.

E number	chemical compound	comment
E200 – E203	sorbic acid, sodium sorbate and sorbates	common for cheese, wine, baked goods, personal care products
E210 – E213	benzoic acid and benzoates	used in acidic foods such as jams, salad dressing, juices, pickles, carbonated drinks, soy sauce
E214 – E219	parabens	stable at a broad pH range
E220 – E228	sulfur dioxide and sulfites	common for fruits, wine
E249 – E250	nitrites	speed up the curing of meat and also impart an attractive colour, no effect on botulism bacteria
E251 – E252	nitrates	used in meats
E270	lactic acid	-
E280 – E283	propionic acid and propionates	baked goods
E338	phosphoric acid	used in some jams, preserves and carbonated drinks; also used for acidification and for flavouring.

=== Antioxidants ===
The free radical pathway for the first phase of the oxidative rancidification of fats. This process is slowed by antioxidants.

The oxidation process spoils most food, especially those with a high fat content. Fats quickly turn rancid when exposed to oxygen. Antioxidants prevent or inhibit the oxidation process. The most common antioxidant additives are ascorbic acid (vitamin C) and ascorbates. Thus, antioxidants are commonly added to oils, cheese, and chips. Other antioxidants include the phenol derivatives BHA, BHT, TBHQ and propyl gallate. These agents suppress the formation of hydroperoxides.

E number	chemical compound	comment
E300-304	ascorbic acid, sodium ascorbate	cheese, chips
E321	butylated hydroxytoluene, butylated hydroxyanisole	also used in food packaging
E310-312	gallic acid and sodium gallate	oxygen scavenger
E220 – E227	sulfur dioxide and sulfites	beverages, wine
E306 – E309	tocopherols	vitamin E activity

A variety of agents are added to sequester (deactivate) metal ions that otherwise catalyze the oxidation of fats. Common sequestering agents are disodium EDTA, citric acid (and citrates), tartaric acid, and lecithin.

=== Nonsynthetic compounds for food preservation ===
Citric and ascorbic acids target enzymes that degrade fruits and vegetables, e.g., mono/polyphenol oxidase which turns surfaces of cut apples and potatoes brown. Ascorbic acid and tocopherol, which are vitamins, are common preservatives. Smoking entails exposing food to a variety of phenols, which are antioxidants. Natural preservatives include rosemary and oregano extract, hops, salt, sugar, vinegar, alcohol, diatomaceous earth and castor oil.

Traditional preservatives, such as sodium benzoate have raised health concerns in the past. Benzoate was shown in a study to cause hypersensitivity in some asthma sufferers. This has caused reexamination of natural preservatives which occur in vegetables.

=== Public awareness of food preservation ===
Public awareness of food preservatives is uneven. Americans have a perception that food-borne illnesses happen more often in other countries. This may be true, but the occurrence of illnesses, hospitalizations, and deaths are still high. It is estimated by the Centers for Disease Control (CDC) that each year there are 76 million illnesses, 325,000 hospitalizations, and 5,000 deaths linked to food-borne illness.

Food suppliers are facing difficulties with regards to the safety and quality of their products as a result of the rising demand for ready-to-eat fresh food products. Artificial preservatives meet some of these challenges by preserving freshness for longer periods of time, but these preservatives can cause negative side-effects as well.

- Sodium nitrite is a preservative used in lunch meats, hams, sausages, hot dogs, and bacon to prevent botulism and other foodborne pathogens. It serves the important function of controlling the bacteria that cause botulism, but sodium nitrite can react with proteins, or during cooking at high heats, to form carcinogenic N-nitrosamines. It has also been linked to cancer in lab animals.
- The commonly used sodium benzoate has been found to extend the shelf life of bottled tomato paste to 40 weeks without loss of quality. However, it can form the carcinogen benzene when combined with vitamin C. Many food manufacturers have reformed their products to eliminate this combination, but a risk still exists.

== Preservation of other products ==
Water-based home and personal care products use broad-spectrum preservatives, such as isothiazolinones and formaldehyde releasers, which may cause sensitization, leading to allergic skin.

Substance	Use
parabens	personal care products
isothiazolinones (MIT, CMIT, BIT)	not for food: home and personal care products, paints/coatings
formaldehyde releasers (DMDM hydantoin)	not for food: home and personal care products

== See also ==
- Stabilizer (chemistry) – Chemical used to prevent degradation
- wood preservation – Treatment or process aimed at extending the service life of wood structures
- food preservation – Inhibition of microbial growth in food
