= C3H3NOS =

The molecular formula C_{3}H_{3}NOS may refer to:

- Isothiazolinone
- Thiazolone
