= MCIT =

MCIT can mean:

- Methylchloroisothiazolinone
- Ministry of Communications and Information Technology
- Mobile Crisis Intervention Team
