= C3H3NS =

The molecular formula C_{3}H_{3}NS (molar mass: 85.13 g/mol, exact mass: 84.9986 u) may refer to:

- Isothiazole, or 1,2-thiazole
- Thiazole, or 1,3-thiazole
