= Benzisothiazolinone =

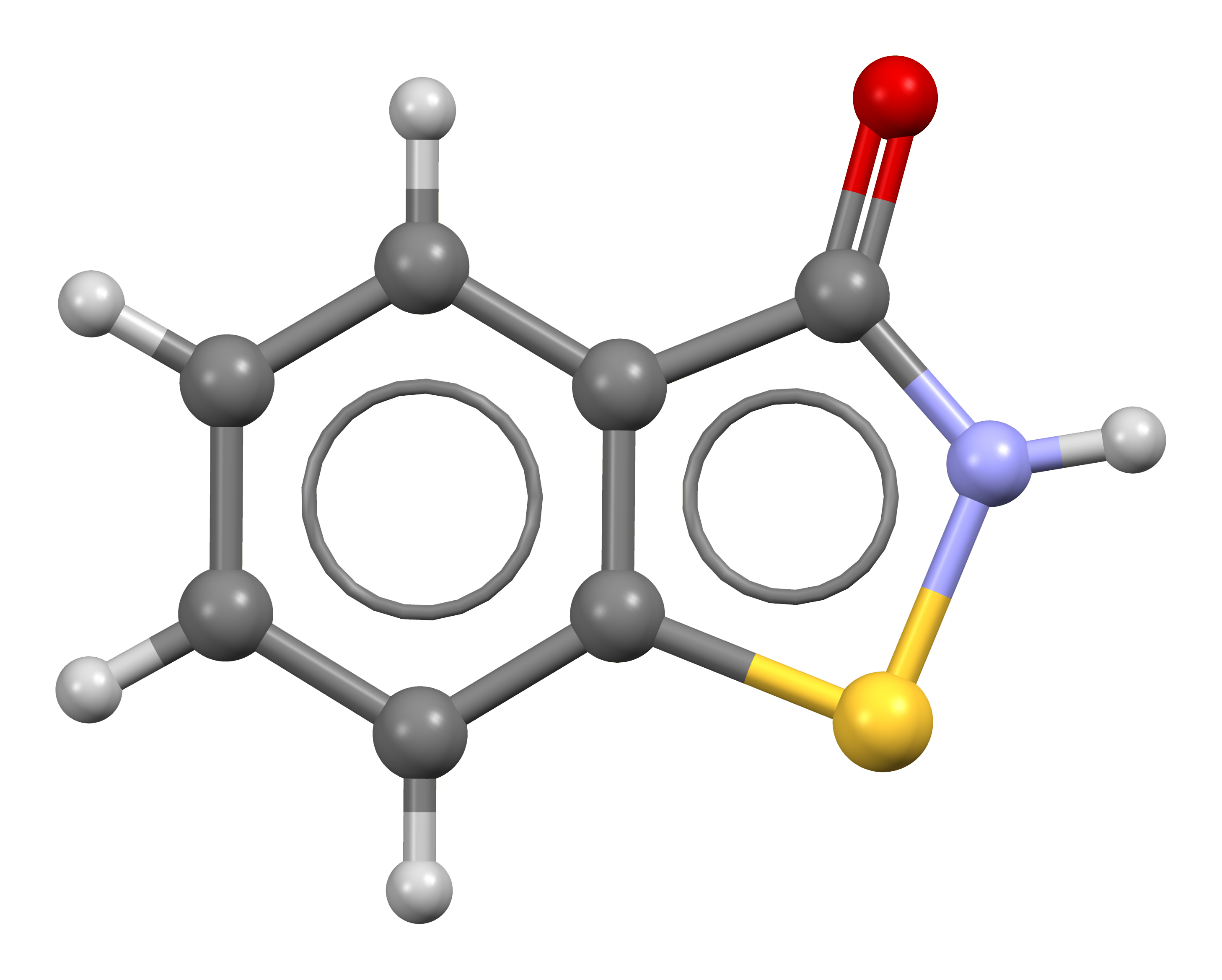

Names
- Preferred IUPAC name 1,2-Benzothiazol-3(2H)-one
- Other names Benzisothiazolinone, Benzisothiazolin-3-one, Benzisothiazolone

Identifiers
CAS Number	2634-33-5
3D model (JSmol)	Interactive image
Abbreviations	BIT
Beilstein Reference	119510
ChEBI	CHEBI:167099
ChEMBL	ChEMBL297304
ChemSpider	16567
ECHA InfoCard	100.018.292
EC Number	220-120-9
MeSH	1,2-benzisothiazoline-3-one
PubChem CID	17520
RTECS number	DE4620000
UNII	HRA0F1A4R3
CompTox Dashboard (EPA)	DTXSID5032523
- InChI: InChI=1S/C7H5NOS/c9-7-5-3-1-2-4-6(5)10-8-7/h1-4H,(H,8,9) Key: DMSMPAJRVJJAGA-UHFFFAOYSA-N; InChI=1/C7H5NOS/c9-7-5-3-1-2-4-6(5)10-8-7/h1-4H,(H,8,9) Key: DMSMPAJRVJJAGA-UHFFFAOYAC
- SMILES: O=C1c2ccccc2SN1

Properties
Chemical formula	C_{7}H_{5}NOS
Molar mass	151.18 g·mol^{−1}
Appearance	white powder
Melting point	158 °C (316 °F; 431 K)
Solubility in water	1 g/L

Hazards
- GHS labelling
Pictograms	(GHS05: Corrosive) (GHS07: Exclamation mark) (GHS09: Environmental hazard)
Signal word	Danger
Hazard statements	H302, H315, H317, H318, H400
Precautionary statements	P261, P264, P270, P272, P273, P280, P301+P312, P302+P352, P305+P351+P338, P310, P321, P330, P332+P313, P333+P313, P362, P363, P391, P501
- Except where otherwise noted, data are given for materials in their standard state (at 25 °C [77 °F], 100 kPa). verify (what is ?) Infobox references

Benzisothiazolinone (BIT) is an organic compound with the formula C_{6}H_{4}SN(H)CO. A white solid, it is structurally related to isothiazole, and is part of a class of molecules called isothiazolinones. BIT is widely used as a preservative and antimicrobial.

== Usage ==
Benzisothiazolinone has a microbicide and a fungicide mode of action. It is widely used as a preservative, for example in:

- emulsion paints, caulks, varnishes, adhesives, inks, and photographic processing solutions
- home cleaning and car care products; laundry detergents, stain removers and fabric softeners;
- industrial settings, for example in textile spin-finish solutions, leather processing solutions, preservation of fresh animal hides and skins
- agriculture in pesticide formulations
- gas and oil drilling in muds and packer fluids preservation.

In paints, it is commonly used alone or as a mixture with methylisothiazolinone. Typical concentrations in products are 200–400 ppm depending on the application area and the combination with other biocides. According to a study in Switzerland, 19% of the paints, varnishes and coatings contained BIT in 2000. The fraction in adhesives, sealants, plasters and fillers was shown at that time as 25%. A later study in 2014 shows a dramatic rise in usage, to 95.8% of house paints.

Home cleaning and other care products that are high in water are easily contaminated by microorganisms, so isothiazolinones are often used as a preservative in these products because they are good at combatting a broad array of bacteria, fungi, and yeasts.

A Swiss investigation found that BIT is used in concentrations between 50 and 500 ppm in tattooing ink. According to regulations in the EU and Switzerland, BIT cannot be used in cosmetics. However, it is allowed in the United States and Canada.

== Health hazards ==
Given sufficient dose and duration, dermal exposure can produce skin sensitization and allergic contact dermatitis, and is classified as an irritant for skin and eyes. BIT's low molar mass allows for it to penetrate the epidermis and then react with the skin macromolecules, which causes the irritation. Benzisothiazolinone has also been linked with Systemic Contact Dermatitis via airborne contact.

In 2012, the Scientific Committee on Consumer Safety in Europe found BIT's "sensitising potential is of concern...Sensitisation from related isothiazolinones is an important problem in consumers. This has occurred because there has been consumer exposure before safe levels of exposure relevant to sensitisation have been established. Benzisothiazolinone is a skin sensitiser in animal models with potency similar to methylisothiazolinone. Methylisothiazolinone, at 100 ppm (0.01%) in cosmetic products is causing contact allergy and allergic contact dermatitis in the consumer. Benzisothiazolinone is known to be a sensitiser in man and has induced sensitisation at circa 20 ppm in gloves."

The opinion further states: "There is no information on what may be safe levels of exposure to benzisothiazolinone in cosmetic products from the point of view of sensitisation. Until safe levels of exposure have been established, the use of benzisothiazolinone in cosmetic products as a preservative or for other functions cannot be considered safe in relation to sensitisation."

Later, in 2013, researchers published a study that set out to derive the highest concentration of BIT in certain consumer products that would result in exposures below the No Expected Sensitization Induction Level (NESIL); that is, where normal use would yield a dose below the level at which skin sensitization might occur. The products under consideration were sunscreen, laundry detergent, dish soap, and spray cleaner; by way of calculation they derived BIT NESILs of 0.0075%, 0.035%, 0.035%, and 0.021%, respectively. They then performed a pilot examination via bulk sample analysis of one representative product from each category labelled as containing BIT. Their findings showed all BIT concentrations well below the derived NESIL, with 0.0009% and 0.0027% for sunscreen and dish soap, respectively, and no detection in the laundry detergent and spray cleaner products, meaning the concentration was at or below the limit of detection of 0.0006%.

== Literature ==
- Wilfried Paulus: Directory of Microbicides for the Protection of Materials and Processes. Springer Netherland, Berlin 2006, ISBN 1-4020-4861-0.
