= Thiazolone =

2-Thiazolone

Thiazolone is a type of heterocyclic compound with the formula (CH)_{2}(NH)(CO)S where the NH and S centers are not mutually bonded. Isothiazolones feature an N-S bond.

The isomers of thiazolones are:

- 2-thiazolone, with carbonyl between NH and S, RN = 6039–97–0, m.p. = 69-70 °C
- 4-thiazolone, with carbonyl adjacent to NH, not S, RN = 5666–37–5, b.p. = 183 °C
- 5-thiazolone, with carbonyl adjacent to S, not NH, RN = 5666–38–6, b.p. unknown
