= Methylisothiazolinone =

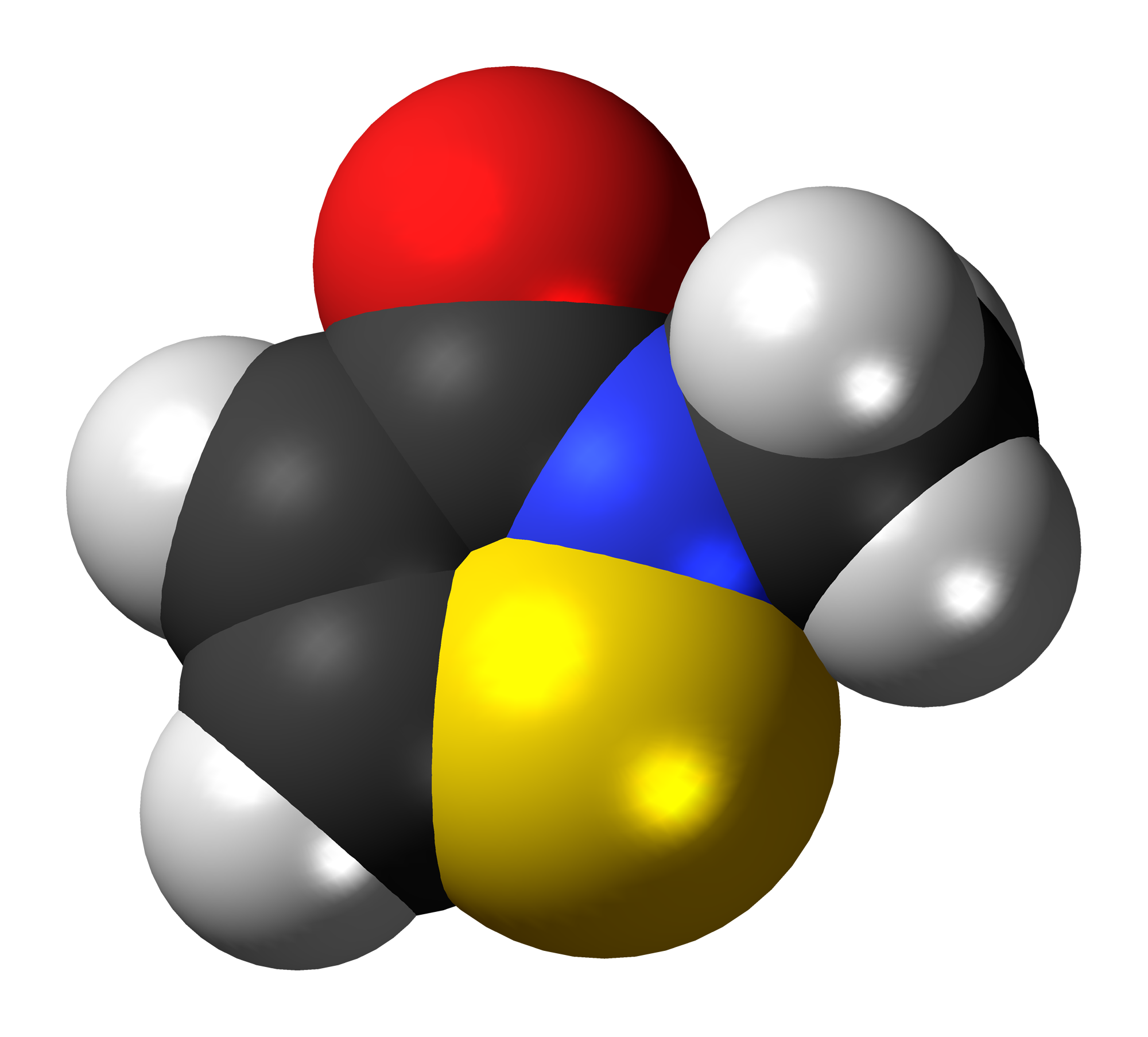

Names
- Preferred IUPAC name 2-Methyl-1,2-thiazol-3(2H)-one
- Other names 2-Methylisothiazol-3(2H)-one; 2-Methyl-4-isothiazolin-3-one

Identifiers
CAS Number	2682-20-4
3D model (JSmol)	Interactive image
Abbreviations	MIT, MI
Beilstein Reference	606203
ChEBI	CHEBI:53620
ChEMBL	ChEMBL1620780
ChemSpider	36393
ECHA InfoCard	100.018.399
EC Number	220-239-6
PubChem CID	39800
UNII	229D0E1QFA
CompTox Dashboard (EPA)	DTXSID2034259
- InChI: InChI=1S/C4H5NOS/c1-5-4(6)2-3-7-5/h2-3H,1H3 Key: BEGLCMHJXHIJLR-UHFFFAOYSA-N; InChI=1/C4H5NOS/c1-5-4(6)2-3-7-5/h2-3H,1H3
- SMILES: O=C1/C=C\SN1C

Properties
Chemical formula	C_{4}H_{5}NOS
Molar mass	115.1 g/mol
Appearance	white solid

Hazards
- GHS labelling
Pictograms	(GHS05: Corrosive) (GHS06: Toxic) (GHS07: Exclamation mark) (GHS09: Environmental hazard)
Signal word	Danger
Hazard statements	H301, H311, H314, H317, H330, H410
Precautionary statements	P260, P264, P270, P271, P272, P273, P280, P284, P301+P310, P301+P330+P331, P302+P352, P303+P361+P353, P304+P340, P305+P351+P338, P310, P312, P320, P321, P330, P333+P313, P361, P363, P391, P403+P233, P405, P501
- Except where otherwise noted, data are given for materials in their standard state (at 25 °C [77 °F], 100 kPa). verify (what is ?) Infobox references

Methylisothiazolinone (/ˌmɛθəlˌaɪsoʊˌθaɪ.əˈzoʊlɪnoʊn/), MIT, or MI, is the organic compound with the formula S(CH)_{2}C(O)NCH_{3}. It is a white solid. Isothiazolinones, a class of heterocycles, are used as biocides in numerous personal care products and other industrial applications. MIT and related compounds have attracted much attention for their allergenic properties, e.g. contact dermatitis.

== Chemistry ==
It is prepared by cyclization of cis-N-methyl-3-thiocyanoacrylamide:

NCSCH=CHC(O)NHCH_{3} → SCH=CHC(O)NCH_{3} + HCN

The crystal and molecular structure of methylisothiazolinone, as determined by in situ cryocrystallography, was reported for the first time in 2024.

== Applications ==
Methylisothiazolinone is used for controlling microbial growth in water-containing solutions. It is typically used in a formulation with 5-chloro-2-methyl-4-isothiazolin-3-one (CMIT), in a 3:1 mixture (CMIT:MIT) sold commercially as Kathon. Kathon is supplied to manufacturers as a concentrated stock solution containing from 1.5 to 15% of CMIT/MIT. Kathon also has been used to control slime in the manufacture of paper products that contact food. In addition, this product serves as an antimicrobial agent in latex adhesives and in paper coatings that also contact food.

== Hazards ==
MIT is allergenic and cytotoxic, and this has led to some concern over its use. A report released by the European Scientific Committee on Cosmetic Products and Non-food Products Intended for Consumers (SCCNFP) in 2003 also concluded that insufficient information was available to allow for an adequate risk assessment analysis of MIT.

Rising reports of consumer impact led to new research, including a report released in 2014 by the European Commission Scientific Committee on Consumer Safety which reported:

The dramatic rise in the rates of reported cases of contact allergy to MI, as detected by diagnostic patch tests, is unprecedented in Europe; there have been repeated warnings about the rise. The increase is primarily caused by increasing consumer exposure to MI from cosmetic products; exposures to MI in household products, paints and in the occupational setting also need to be considered. The delay in re-evaluation of the safety of MI in cosmetic products is of concern to the SCCS; it has adversely affected consumer safety.

The American Contact Dermatitis Society named methylisothiazolinone "contact allergen of the year" in 2013. The North American Contact Dermatitis Group found that methylisothiazolinone caused 10.9% positive reactions, being the third most common contact allergen in patch test results which surveyed close to 5000 contact dermatitis patients. Additionally, new research into cross reactivity of MIT-sensitized patients to variants benzisothiazolinone and octylisothiazolinone have found that reactions may occur if present in sufficient amounts.

In the United States, the Environmental Protection Agency has a 1998 data sheet on methylisothiazolinone in their Pesticides section which reads in part "Human Health Assessment: Toxicity: In studies using laboratory animals, methylisothiazolinone has been shown to be of moderate acute toxicity by the oral and inhalation routes. It is highly acutely toxic when applied dermally or to the eye and is considered to be corrosive."

== Regulation ==
In 2014, the European Commission Scientific Committee on Consumer Safety further issued a voluntary ban on the MCI/MI mixture from leave-on products such as body creams. The measure applied for products placed on the market after 16 July 2015." Shortly thereafter, Canada moved to adopt similar measures in its Cosmetic Ingredients Hotlist.

Based on the opinion of the Scientific Committee on Consumer Safety (SCCS) of 2013, Commission Regulation (EU) 2016/1198 of 22 July 2016 amending Annex V to Regulation (EC) No 1223/2009 of the European Parliament and of the council on cosmetic products banned the use of methylisothiazolinone in leave-on products (skin creams and lotions) effective 12 February 2017 and limited it to 0.01% in rinse-off products (e.g. shampoo). Effective 27 January 2018 (placing on the market), the maximum concentration in rinse-off products was reduced to 0.0015%.
