= Dichlorooctylisothiazolinone =

Names
- Preferred IUPAC name 4,5-Dichloro-2-octyl-1,2-thiazol-3(2H)-one

Identifiers
CAS Number	64359-81-5
3D model (JSmol)	Interactive image
ChEBI	CHEBI:83518
ChEMBL	ChEMBL110764
ChemSpider	82791
ECHA InfoCard	100.058.930
EC Number	264-843-8
PubChem CID	91688
UNII	HCY9Q844W2
CompTox Dashboard (EPA)	DTXSID5032315
- InChI: InChI=1S/C11H17Cl2NOS/c1-2-3-4-5-6-7-8-14-11(15)9(12)10(13)16-14/h2-8H2,1H3 Key: PORQOHRXAJJKGK-UHFFFAOYSA-N
- SMILES: CCCCCCCCN1C(=O)C(=C(S1)Cl)Cl

Properties
Chemical formula	C_{10}H_{15}Cl_{2}NOS
Molar mass	282.23
Appearance	white solid

Hazards
- GHS labelling
Pictograms	(GHS05: Corrosive) (GHS06: Toxic) (GHS07: Exclamation mark) (GHS09: Environmental hazard)
Signal word	Danger
Hazard statements	H302, H312, H314, H317, H330, H331, H335, H410
Precautionary statements	P260, P264, P270, P271, P272, P273, P280, P284, P301+P312, P301+P330+P331, P302+P352, P303+P361+P353, P304+P340, P305+P351+P338, P310, P311, P312, P320, P321, P330, P333+P313, P363, P391, P403+P233, P405, P501
- Except where otherwise noted, data are given for materials in their standard state (at 25 °C [77 °F], 100 kPa). Infobox references

Dichlorooctylisothiazolinone, DCOIT or DCOI, is the organic compound with the formula SC(Cl)=C(Cl)C(O)NC_{7}H_{15}. It is a white solid that melts near room temperature. It is an isothiazolinone, a class of heterocyclic compounds used as biocides. DCOIT has attracted attention as an antifouling compound. It is a replacement for organotin compounds that have been largely banned for causing environmental damage. DCOIT however is itself controversial.

== Safety ==
Isothiazolinones are highly bioactive and have attracted scrutiny for causing contact dermatitis.
