= Methylchloroisothiazolinone =

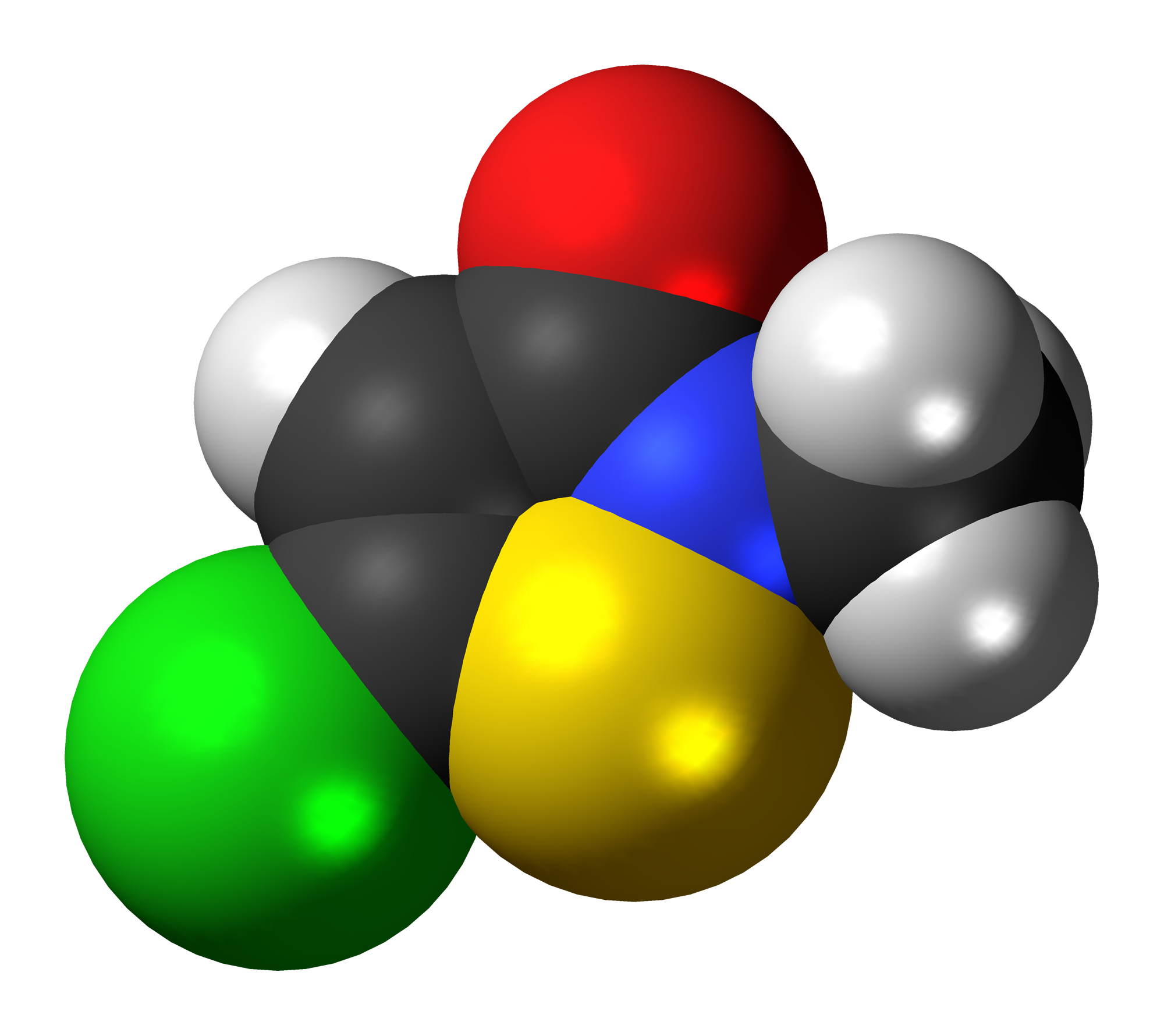

Names
- Preferred IUPAC name 5-Chloro-2-methyl-1,2-thiazol-3(2H)-one
- Other names 5-Chloro-2-methylisothiazol-3(2H)-one; 5-Chloro-2-methyl-4-isothiazolin-3-one; Chloromethylisothiazolinone; Chloromethylisothiazolone; Methylchloroisothiazolinone; Methylchloroisothiazolone; CMI; CMIT; MCI; MCIT; CIT

Identifiers
CAS Number	26172-55-4
3D model (JSmol)	Interactive image
Beilstein Reference	1210149
ChEBI	CHEBI:53621
ChemSpider	30800
DrugBank	DB14197
ECHA InfoCard	100.043.167
EC Number	247-500-7
PubChem CID	33344
UNII	DEL7T5QRPN
CompTox Dashboard (EPA)	DTXSID9034286
- InChI: InChI=1S/C4H4ClNOS/c1-6-4(7)2-3(5)8-6/h2H,1H3 Key: DHNRXBZYEKSXIM-UHFFFAOYSA-N; InChI=1/C4H4ClNOS/c1-6-4(7)2-3(5)8-6/h2H,1H3 Key: DHNRXBZYEKSXIM-UHFFFAOYAV
- SMILES: ClC=1SN(C(=O)C=1)C

Properties
Chemical formula	C_{4}H_{4}ClNOS
Molar mass	149.59 g·mol^{−1}
Appearance	white solid
Density	1.02 g/cm^{3}
Melting point	52 °C (126 °F; 325 K)
Solubility in water	Miscible

Hazards
- GHS labelling
Pictograms	(GHS05: Corrosive) (GHS06: Toxic) (GHS07: Exclamation mark) (GHS09: Environmental hazard)
Signal word	Danger
Hazard statements	H300, H301, H310, H311, H314, H317, H330, H331, H335, H410
Precautionary statements	P260, P262, P264, P270, P271, P272, P273, P280, P284, P301+P310, P301+P330+P331, P302+P350, P302+P352, P303+P361+P353, P304+P340, P305+P351+P338, P310, P311, P312, P320, P321, P330, P333+P313, P361, P363, P391, P403+P233, P405, P501
- Except where otherwise noted, data are given for materials in their standard state (at 25 °C [77 °F], 100 kPa). verify (what is ?) Infobox references

Methylchloroisothiazolinone, also referred to as MCI, is the organic compound with the formula S(C_{2}HCl)C(O)N(CH_{3}). It is a white solid that melts near room temperature. The compound is an isothiazolinone, a class of heterocycles used as biocides. These compounds have an active sulphur moiety that is able to oxidize thiol-containing residues, thereby effectively killing most aerobic and anaerobic bacteria. MCI is often used in combination with methylisothiazolinone, a mixture known as Kathon. The isothiazolinones have attracted attention because they can cause contact dermatitis. Methylchloroisothiazolinone is effective against gram-positive and gram-negative bacteria, yeast, and fungi.

== Application ==
Methylchloroisothiazolinone is found in many water-based personal care products and cosmetics. Methylchloroisothiazolinone was first used in cosmetics in the 1970s. It is also used in glue production, detergents, paints, fuels, and other industrial processes. Methylchloroisothiazolinone is known by the registered tradename Kathon CG when used in combination with methylisothiazolinone.

Methylchloroisothiazolinone may be used in combination with other preservatives including ethylparaben, benzalkonium chloride, bronopol, and phenoxyethanol.

== Hazards ==
Methylchloroisothiazolinone can cause allergic reactions in some people. The first publication of the preservative as a contact allergen was in 1988. Cases of photoaggravated allergic contact dermatitis, i.e. worsening of skin lesions after sun exposure, have also been reported.

In pure form or in high concentrations, methylchloroisothiazolinone is a skin and membrane irritant and causes chemical burns. In the United States, maximum authorized concentrations are 15 ppm in rinse-offs (of a mixture in the ratio 3:1 of 5-chloro-2-methylisothiazol 3(2H)-one and 2-methylisothiazol-3 (2H)-one). In Canada, methylchloroisothiazolinone may only be used in rinse-off products in combination with methylisothiazolinone, the total concentration of the combination may not exceed 15 ppm. In the European Union, methylchloroisothiazolinone is permitted only as part of the MCI/MI preservative mixture under Annex V (entry 39) of the Cosmetics Regulation (EC) No 1223/2009. The mixture, in a 3:1 ratio of methylchloroisothiazolinone to methylisothiazolinone, is allowed only in rinse-off products at a maximum concentration of 0.0015% (15 ppm). Its use was restricted to rinse-off products by Commission Regulation (EU) No 1003/2014, applicable from 16 July 2015.

Methylisothiazolinone is considered safe in the allowed amount in rinse-off products (0.01%) and safe in leave-in products when formulated to be non-sensitizing.

=== Incidents ===
An overdose of Kathon by aircraft maintenance personnel, using 38 times the correct amount, resulted in damage to both engines of a Titan Airways aircraft in February 2020. After losing both engines in succession, the Airbus A321 made an emergency landing at Gatwick Airport. The maintenance procedures specified the Kathon to be diluted to 100 PPM by volume, but with the aircraft maintenance technician being unfamiliar with the term "PPM" and the term not being defined in the aircraft maintenance manuals, the technician instead used an online calculator to convert PPM to percentages, misinterpreted the answer, and added 30 kg of Kathon to each wing tank, which was over 38 times the required amount. Over the course of the next day, the Kathon progressively caused more and more damage to the engines, finally resulting in an emergency landing.
