= Isothiazole =

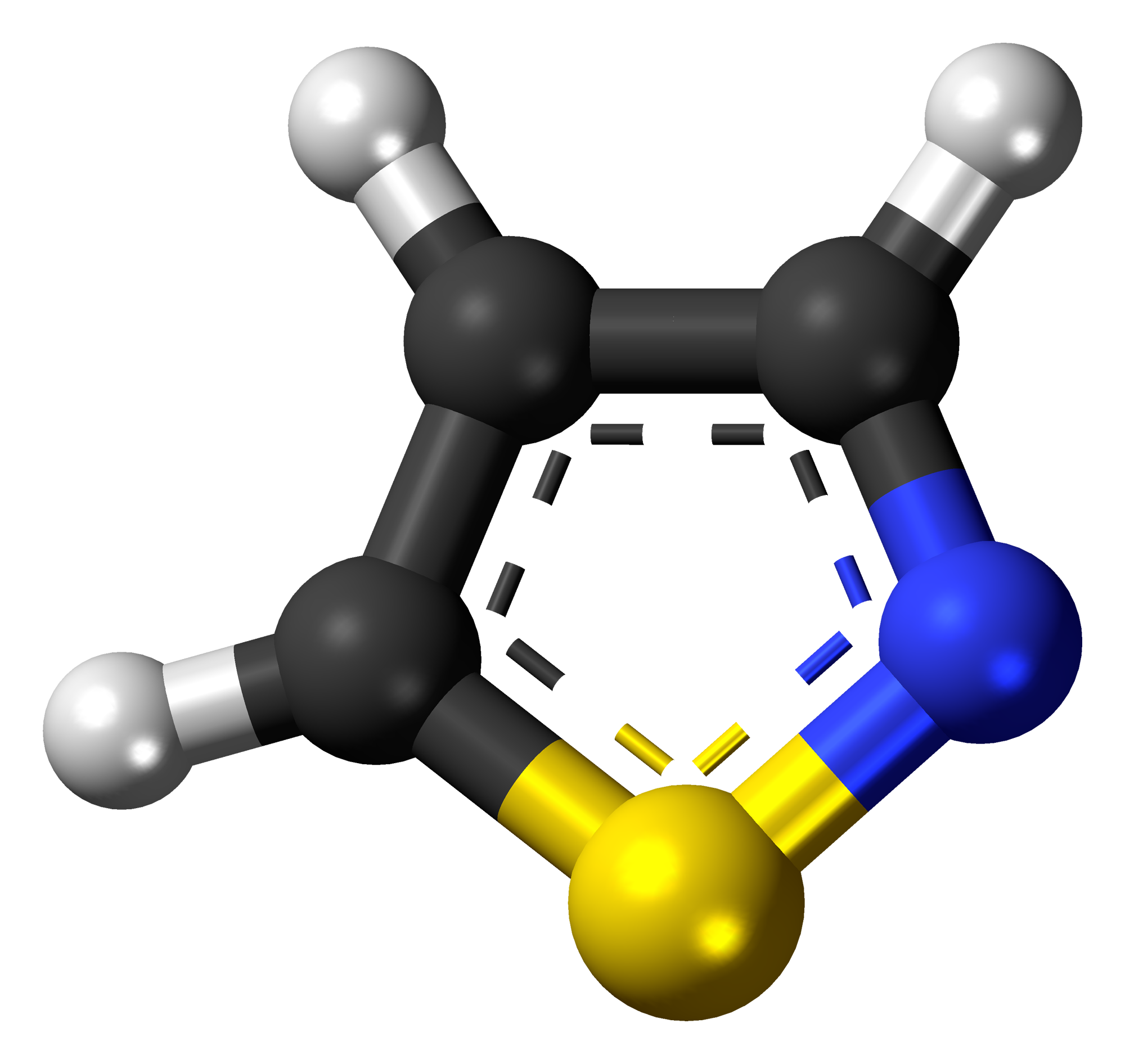

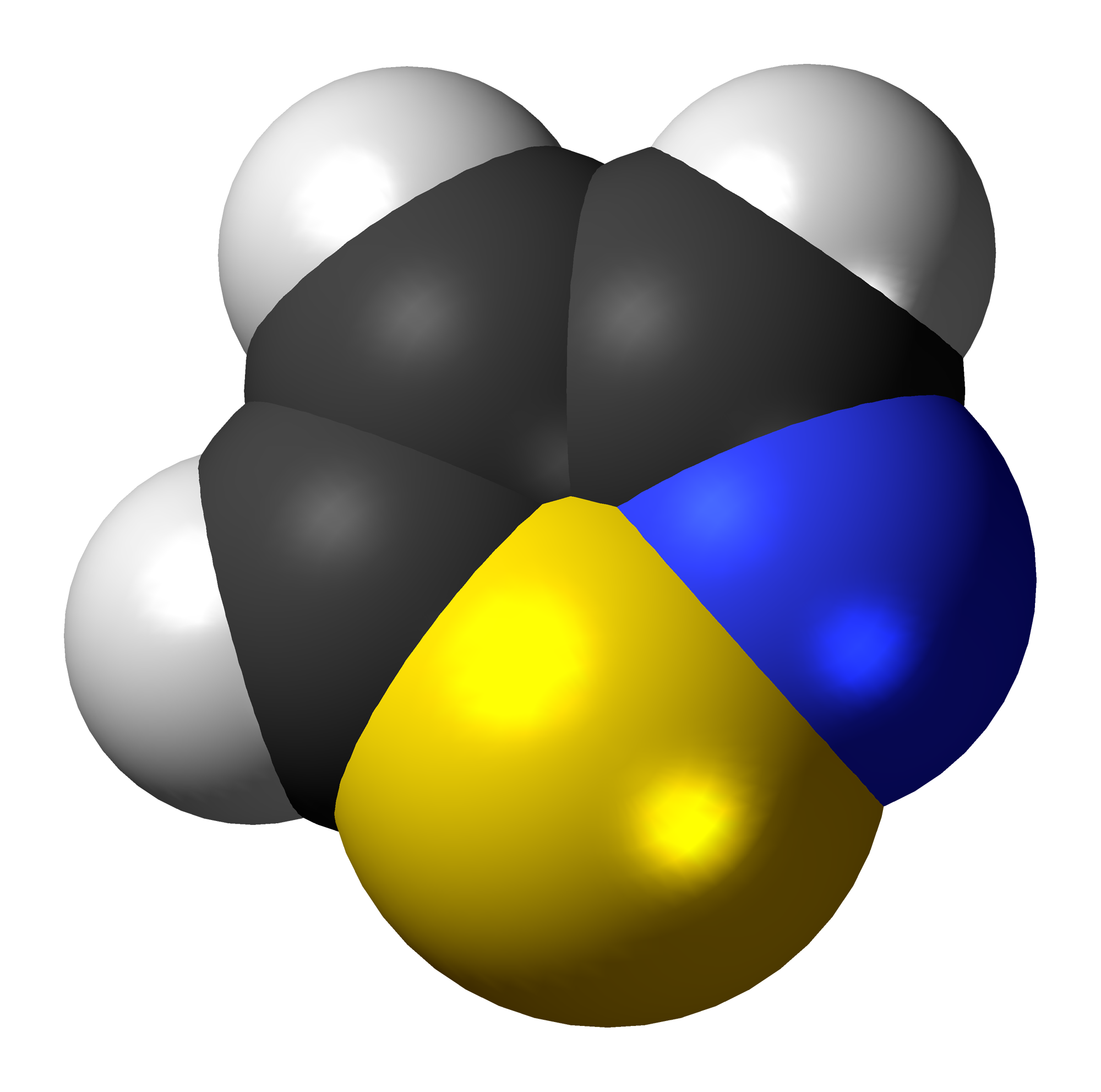

Names
- Preferred IUPAC name 1,2-Thiazole
- Other names isothiazole

Identifiers
CAS Number	288-16-4
3D model (JSmol)	Interactive image
ChEBI	CHEBI:35600
ChemSpider	60838
ECHA InfoCard	100.241.294
PubChem CID	67515
UNII	38FAO14250
CompTox Dashboard (EPA)	DTXSID90182980
- InChI: InChI=1S/C3H3NS/c1-2-4-5-3-1/h1-3H Key: ZLTPDFXIESTBQG-UHFFFAOYSA-N; InChI=1/C3H3NS/c1-2-4-5-3-1/h1-3H Key: ZLTPDFXIESTBQG-UHFFFAOYAS
- SMILES: n1sccc1

Properties
Chemical formula	C_{3}H_{3}NS
Molar mass	85.12 g·mol^{−1}
Boiling point	114 °C (237 °F; 387 K)
Acidity (pK_{a})	−0.5 (of conjugate acid)

Related compounds
Related compounds	thiazole, isoxazole
- Except where otherwise noted, data are given for materials in their standard state (at 25 °C [77 °F], 100 kPa). verify (what is ?) Infobox references

Isothiazole, or 1,2-thiazole, is an organic compound consisting with the formula (CH)_{3}S(N). The ring is unsaturated and features an S-N bond. The isomeric thiazole, where the S and N are not directly bonded are far more common.

Isothiazones are produced by oxidation of enamine-thiones. The ring structure of isothiazole is incorporated into larger compounds with biological activity such as the pharmaceutical drugs ziprasidone and perospirone.

== See also ==
- Isothiazolinone
