= Isothiazolinone =

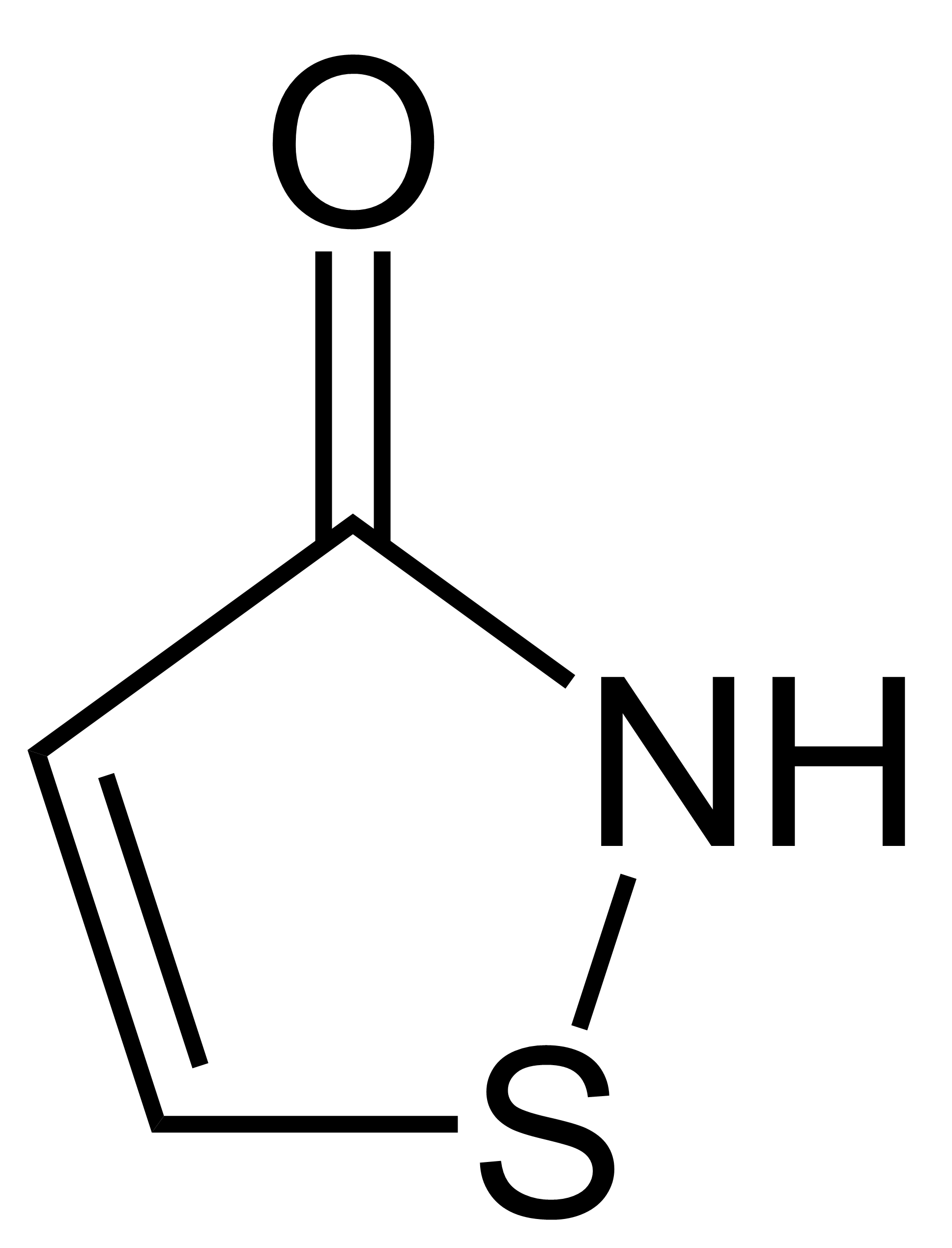

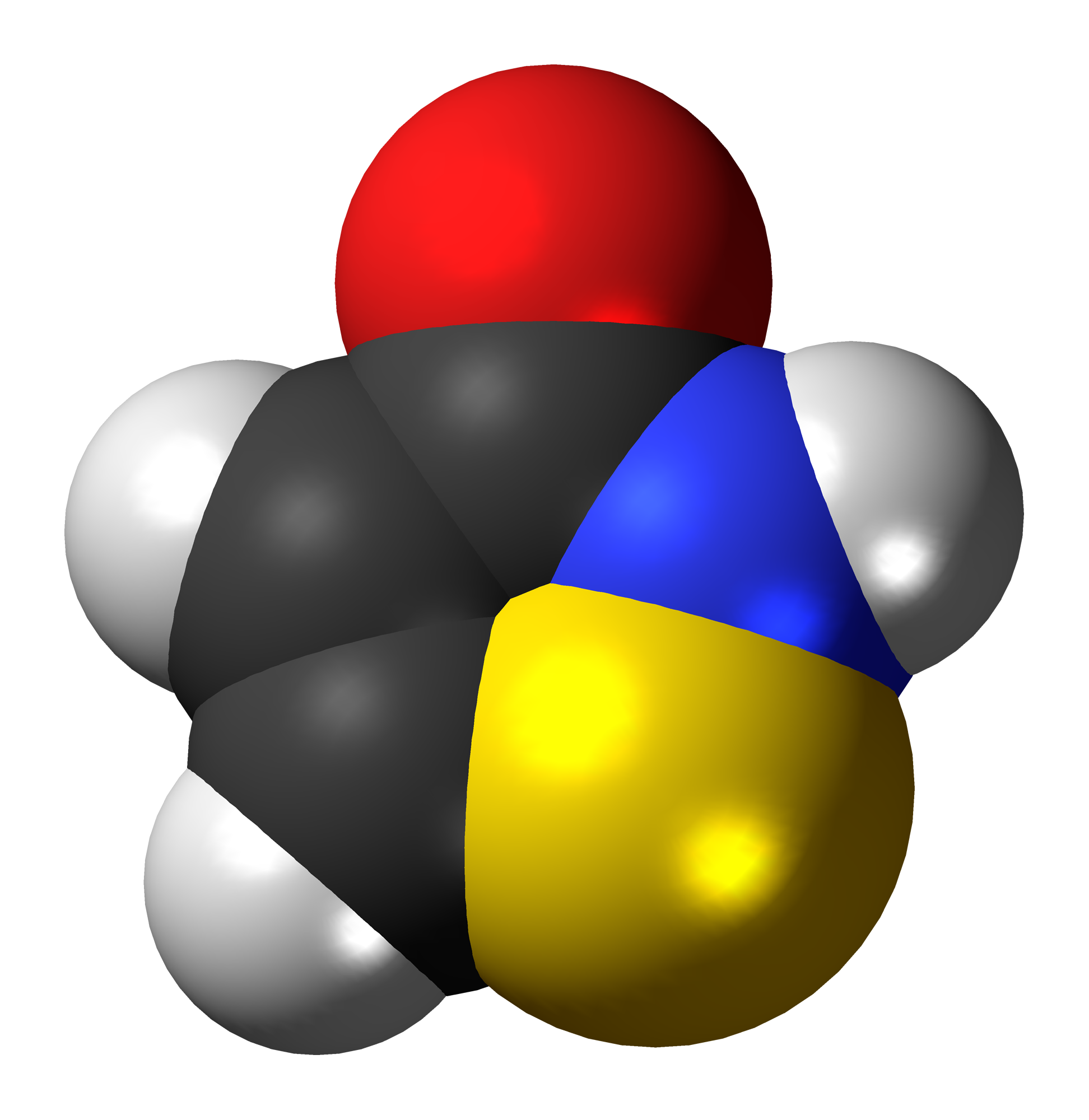

Names
- Preferred IUPAC name 1,2-Thiazol-3(2H)-one
- Other names Isothiazolin-3-one; 3(2H)-Isothiazolone, isothiazolin

Identifiers
CAS Number	1003-07-2
3D model (JSmol)	Interactive image; Interactive image
ChemSpider	87509
ECHA InfoCard	100.225.492
EC Number	696-206-9
MeSH	C001490
PubChem CID	96917
UNII	E57JT172V7
CompTox Dashboard (EPA)	DTXSID9074935
- InChI: InChI=1S/C3H3NOS/c5-3-1-2-6-4-3/h1-2H,(H,4,5) Key: MGIYRDNGCNKGJU-UHFFFAOYSA-N; InChI=1/C3H3NOS/c5-3-1-2-6-4-3/h1-2H,(H,4,5) Key: MGIYRDNGCNKGJU-UHFFFAOYAO
- SMILES: O=C1NSC=C1; c1csnc1O

Properties
Chemical formula	C_{3}H_{3}NOS
Molar mass	101.127
Appearance	white solid
Melting point	74–75 °C (165–167 °F; 347–348 K)

Hazards
- GHS labelling
Pictograms	(GHS07: Exclamation mark)
Signal word	Warning
Hazard statements	H302, H312, H315, H319, H332, H335
- Except where otherwise noted, data are given for materials in their standard state (at 25 °C [77 °F], 100 kPa). verify (what is ?) Infobox references

Isothiazolinone (/ˌaɪsoʊˌθaɪ.əˈzoʊlɪnoʊn/; sometimes isothiazolone) is an organic compound with the formula (CH)_{2}SN(H)CO. A white solid, it is structurally related to isothiazole. Isothiazolone itself is of limited interest, but several of its derivatives are widely used preservatives and antimicrobials.

== Synthesis ==
Compared to many other simple heterocycles, the discovery of isothiazolinone is fairly recent, with reports first appearing in the 1960s.

Isothiazolinones can be prepared on an industrial scale by the ring-closure of 3-mercaptopropanamides. These in turn are produced from acrylic acid via the 3-mercaptopropionic acid:

Ring-closure of the thiol-amide is typically effected by chlorination or oxidation of the 3-sulfanylpropanamide to the corresponding disulfide.

Many other routes have been developed, including addition of thiocyanate to propargyl amides.

== Mechanism of action ==
The antimicrobial activity of isothiazolinones is attributed to their ability to inhibit life-sustaining enzymes, specifically those enzymes with thiols at their active sites. It is established that isothiazolinones form mixed disulfides upon treatment with such species.

== Applications ==
The principal isothiazolones are:

- Methylisothiazolinone (MIT, MI)
- Methylchloroisothiazolinone (MCI)
- Benzisothiazolinone (BIT)
- Octylisothiazolinone (OIT, OI)
- Dichlorooctylisothiazolinone (DCOIT, DCOI)
- Butylbenzisothiazolinone (BBIT)

These compounds all exhibit antimicrobial properties. They are used to control bacteria, fungi, and algae in cooling water systems, fuel storage tanks, pulp and paper mill water systems, oil extraction systems, wood preservation, and some paints. They are antifouling agents. They are frequently used in shampoos and other hair care products.

Methylchloroisothiazolinone (CMIT) and 2-methyl-4-isothiazolin-3-one (methylisothiazolinone or MIT) are popular derivatives. A 3:1 mixture of CMIT:MIT is sold as Kathon. Kathon is supplied as a concentrated stock solution containing from 1.5 to 15% of CMIT/MIT. For applications the recommended use level is from 6 ppm to 75 ppm active isothiazolones.

4,5-Dichloro-2-n-octyl-4-isothiazolino-3-one (DCOI or Sea-Nine 211) is used especially as an antifouling agent, i.e. paint for ship hulls to prevent the formation of barnacles, etc.

== Safety and environmental aspects ==
Together with their wanted function, controlling or killing microorganisms, isothiazolinones also have undesirable effects. Many countries are looking at partial or full bans of the substance due to the known dangers in using the biocide.

=== Environmental ===
Isothiazolinones have a high aquatic toxicity. DCOI has been detected in both port water and sediment samples in Osaka, Japan, especially in weakly circulating mooring areas. DCOI levels threaten various marine invertebrates. Isothiazolinones also are extremely toxic to fish.

=== Dermatitis ===
In 2014 the European Commission Scientific Committee on Consumer Safety reported: "The dramatic rise in the rates of reported cases of contact allergy to MI, as detected by diagnostic patch tests, is unprecedented in Europe; there have been repeated warnings about the rise (Gonçalo M, Goossens A. 2013). The increase is primarily caused by increasing consumer exposure to MI from cosmetic products; exposures to MI in household products, paints and in the occupational setting also need to be considered. The delay in re-evaluation of the safety of MI in cosmetic products is of concern to the SCCS; it has adversely affected consumer safety."

"It is unknown what proportion of the general population is now sensitized to MI and has not been confirmed as sensitized." In 2014, the European Commission Scientific Committee on Consumer Safety further issued a voluntary ban on "the mixture of Methylchloroisothiazolinone (and) Methylisothiazolinone (MCI/MI) from leave-on products such as body creams. The measure is aimed at reducing the risk from and the incidence of skin allergies. The preservative can still be used in rinse-off products such as shampoos and shower gels at a maximum concentration of 0.0015 % of a mixture in the ratio 3:1 of MCI/MI. The measure will apply for products placed on the market after 16 July 2015." Shortly thereafter, Canada moved to adopt similar measures in its Cosmetic Ingredients Hotlist. Additionally, new research into cross reactivity of MI-sensitized patients to variants benzisothiazolinone and octylisothiazolinone have found that reactions may occur if present in sufficient amounts.

== Allergic contact dermatitis ==
Methylisothiazolinone is used commonly in products in conjunction with methylchloroisothiazolinone, a mixture sold under the registered trade name Kathon CG. A common indication of sensitivity to Kathon CG is allergic contact dermatitis. Sensitization to this family of preservatives was observed as early as the late 1980s.The use of isothiazolinone-based preservatives has resulted in many incidences of contact allergy. In 2013 the substance was declared the 2013 Contact Allergen of the Year by the American Contact Dermatitis Society. In 2016 the Dermatitis Academy launched a call to action for patients to report their isothiazolinone allergy to the FDA.

On December 13, 2013, the trade group, Cosmetics Europe, following discussions with the European Society of Contact Dermatitis (ESCD), recommended to its members "that the use of Methylisothiazolinone (MIT) in leave-on skin products including cosmetic wet wipes is discontinued. This action is recommended in the interests of consumer safety in relation to adverse skin reactions. It is recommended that companies do not wait for regulatory intervention under the Cosmetics Regulation but implement this recommendation as soon as feasible."

On March 27, 2014, the European Commission's Scientific Committee on Consumer Safety issued an opinion on the safety of Methylisothiazolinone. This report only considered the issue of contact sensitization. The committee concluded:

“Current clinical data indicate that 100 ppm MI in cosmetic products is not safe for the consumer.

"For leave-on cosmetic products (including ‘wet wipes’), no safe concentrations of MI for induction of contact allergy or elicitation have been adequately demonstrated.

"For rinse-off cosmetic products, a concentration of 15 ppm (0.0015%) MI is considered safe for the consumer from the view of induction of contact allergy. However, no information is available on elicitation.”

Colgate-Palmolive had added it as an ingredient in a mouthwash put onto the market in August 2014 with the name Colgate Total Lasting White.

In industrial use, the greatest occupational inhalation exposure occurs during open pouring. Non-occupational exposure to isothiazolinones by the general population also occurs, albeit at much lower concentrations. These compounds are present in a number of commonly used cosmetics.
