= Nils Christensen =

Nils Christensen or Kristensen may refer to:

- Nils Christensen (aviator) (1921–2017), Norwegian-Canadian aviator
- Nils Christensen Ringnæs (1792–1863), Norwegian politician
- Nils Reinhardt Christensen (1919–1990), Norwegian film director and screenwriter
- Nils Christiansen (1913–1988), Filipino swimmer
- Niels Christiansen (born 1966), Danish businessman, CEO of Lego
- Niels Christensen (1865–1952), Danish-American inventor
- Niels Christian Christensen, (1881–1945), Danish sport shooter
- Niels Kristensen (born 1988), Danish football midfielder
- Niels Kristensen (rower) (born 1920), Danish rower
