= General Motors Technical Center =

Industrial complex in Warren, Michigan

- U.S. National Register of Historic Places
- U.S. National Historic Landmark
- Michigan State Historic Site
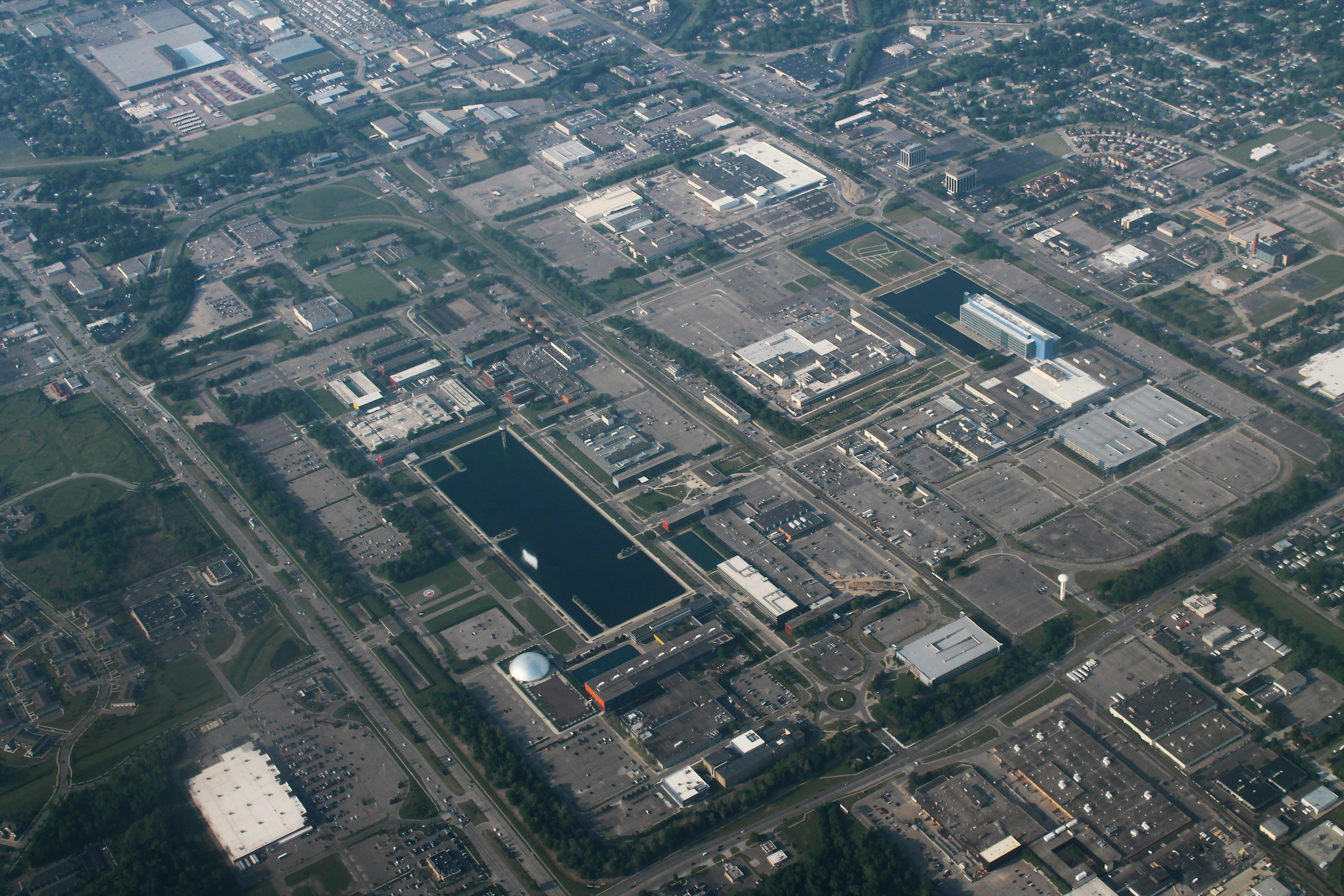
- Aerial view of the General Motors Technical Center

- Location within Michigan Location within the United States
- Interactive ma
- Location: Bounded by 12 Mile, Mound and Chicago Rds, and Van Dyke Ave., Warren, Michigan
- Coordinates: 42°30′48″N 83°02′16″W
- Area: 600 acres (240 ha)
- Built: 1949–1956 (original buildings); 1957–1970, 1974–1985 (expansions)
- Architect: Eero Saarinen and Argonaut Realty; Thomas Dolliver Church (landscape)
- Architectural style: Mid-century modern
- NRHP reference No.: 00000224

Significant dates
- Added to NRHP: March 27, 2000
- Designated NHL: August 25, 2014

The General Motors Technical Center (also the Warren Technical Center; sometimes shortened as the Tech Center) in Warren, Michigan, United States, is the primary design and engineering center for General Motors (GM). The facility opened in stages from the 1950s to the 1970s. It was designed by Eero Saarinen and Argonaut Realty, with the landscaping designed by Thomas Church. A railroad track runs north–south through the Tech Center, dividing it into west and east campuses, each with its own central rectangular lake.

GM chairman Alfred P. Sloan and research director Charles F. Kettering devised the Tech Center to separate the company's research and development activities from its other divisions. At the urging of GM executive Harley Earl, Sloan hired Eliel Saarinen and Robert Swanson in 1944 to draw up the initial plans. Material shortages postponed the beginning of construction to 1949; the initial part of the complex, overseen by Eero Saarinen, was dedicated on May 16, 1956, and included seven clusters of buildings. Additional structures and expansions were constructed over the next two decades. A major renovation in the late 1990s and early 2000s added the Vehicle Engineering Center (VEC). As part of a further renovation in the early 21st century, further buildings were constructed, including the Wallace Innovation Center and Design West in the 2020s.

The complex is composed mostly of low-rise buildings in the mid-century modern style. The older west campus originally included buildings housing five divisions, while the buildings in the later east campus did not share as many architectural features. The landscape design consists of trees, lawns, water features, and roads placed around the complex. The original buildings share design features, such as facades of glass, enameled steel, and colorful glazed brick. The interiors are arranged on modular grids, with varying materials and color palettes, and there are numerous artworks spread across the grounds. The Technical Center received praise from both contemporary and retrospective observers and, as Saarinen's first solo design, influenced his later work. The complex has received the American Institute of Architects' Twenty-five Year Award, is listed on the National Register of Historic Places, and is designated a Michigan State Historic Site and a National Historic Landmark.

== History ==
=== Development ===
By the 1940s, General Motors (GM) was becoming one of the United States' largest companies and wished to consolidate its research and development (R&D) activities in one location. GM chairman Alfred P. Sloan wanted a campus in suburban Detroit, separate from the company's factories and management facilities, to house the company's R&D activities. He proposed a technical campus in conjunction with Charles F. Kettering, GM's research director, who wanted to improve productivity by relocating research activities away from production lines. Kettering and Sloan first discussed plans for the Technical Center in March 1944 and presented them to GM's board of directors that December. GM obtained a 0.5-by-1.5-mile (0.80 by 2.41 km) site north of Detroit, (Note: Some sources cite the site as 350 acres (140 ha), but a 0.75-square-mile (1.9 km^{2}) site would be equal to 480 acres (190 ha).) near Thirteen Mile and Mound roads, for the Technical Center. GM acquired the first 100 acres (40 ha) from Henry Halmich for about $700 per acre ($1,700/ha). (Note: Equivalent to $12,800 per acre ($5,100 per hectare) in 2025) The site, located in the suburb of Warren, abutted a railroad line and was a 30-minute drive from the General Motors Building in Detroit. At the time, the site was farmland.

==== Design ====
Sloan initially envisioned developing utilitarian structures, a position espoused by Kettering, who did not care for an architecturally distinguished campus. GM's vice president of styling, Harley Earl, encouraged Sloan to develop a visually distinctive complex with a proper architect. Sloan eventually agreed to Earl's proposal after convincing one skeptical board member, and GM officials visited Albert Kahn's nearby Ethyl Corporation complex and the Cranbrook Educational Community for inspiration. The partnership of Eliel Saarinen and Robert Swanson began drawing plans for GM's technical campus in late 1944. The initial plans called for five buildings to be arranged around an artificial lake, designed with the landscape architect Thomas Church. The plans called for interconnected buildings with ground-floor parking and lakefront views; dirt from the lake would have been used to create terraces around the buildings. The plans, designed in the Art Moderne and International styles, resembled GM's 1939 World's Fair pavilion, which Eliel's son Eero had helped design. Hugh Ferriss drew renderings of the plans, which were circulated widely in the architectural media.

The plans were announced at a luncheon at the Waldorf Astoria New York on July 24, 1945. Though GM did not divulge the exact cost, multiple sources estimated the cost at $20 million. (Note: Equivalent to $275 million in 2024) Saarinen & Swanson were formally hired in September 1945, and GM appointed the first administrative staff for the Technical Center the same month. Hubell, Roth and Clark were hired as the engineers. A groundbreaking ceremony took place on October 23, and GM began soliciting bids for the first contracts, related to drainage, that December. By 1946, GM had been forced to pause development of its technical center due to post–World War II material shortages. GM fired Saarinen & Swanson, focusing instead on its existing product line.

In 1948, GM rehired Saarinen, Saarinen & Associates (renamed from Saarinen & Swanson) to revise the original plans, the cost of which had increased significantly. Eero Saarinen, by then a partner in the firm, simplified the original plans, designing a complex of rectangular buildings partially inspired by Ludwig Mies van der Rohe's IIT Academic Campus. The plans incorporated more of Eero's own ideas, shifting away from his father's design principles. Due to GM's requirement that each division's structures be physically separated, the buildings were split into multiple groups surrounding a lake. GM also wanted low-rise buildings rather than skyscrapers, which necessitated a sprawling complex. Saarinen's revised plans initially called for a 10-story tower adjoining a central lake, but when the tower was canceled, he substituted it with large water fountains and a tall water tower. Increasing costs forced Saarinen to downsize some of the other buildings as well. Saarinen's associate J. Henderson Barr drew up renderings of the various sections of the complex.

==== Construction ====
In May 1949, GM announced that it would begin constructing the Technical Center after four years of design work and delays. The construction of the Technical Center was to free up space at GM's other facilities. GM hired Bryant & Detwiler Co. of Detroit as the construction contractor, and it hired Smith, Hinchman and Grylls as the engineers. At the time, the first buildings were scheduled to open in mid-1950, and the complex was scheduled to be completed in 1953. Excavations for the first buildings' sites began in July 1949. Work proceeded quickly enough that the first three buildings, for the engineering department, were nearly completed by mid-1950, a year after work started. Although many contractors balked at constructing the engineering office building's novel framework, a local firm was able to construct it for little more than the cost of a conventional steel frame. Some parts of the buildings, such as glazed brick walls, were manufactured on site. GM also developed several testing and support facilities for the various divisions, such as a test track and wind tunnel.

The first three structures opened September 6, 1951, and the test track opened that year. Concurrently, GM announced further details of its plans, which called for glass-walled structures with brick panels, as well as open plan spaces without pillars. Work on the final cluster of buildings in the original campus began in May 1952, and a metallurgy building, the first of the research laboratories, opened that June. The process development and styling divisions were also under development. GM subsidiary Chevrolet announced in 1953 that it would build three structures at the southeast corner of the original campus. Another GM subsidiary, Fisher Body, announced the same year that it would build three structures there. The Chevrolet and Fisher Body complexes were part of a $1 billion expansion plan for GM. (Note: Equivalent to $12.019 billion in 2025) At this point, the original campus was half complete. Workers had moved into the engineering research and fuel blend buildings by November 1953.

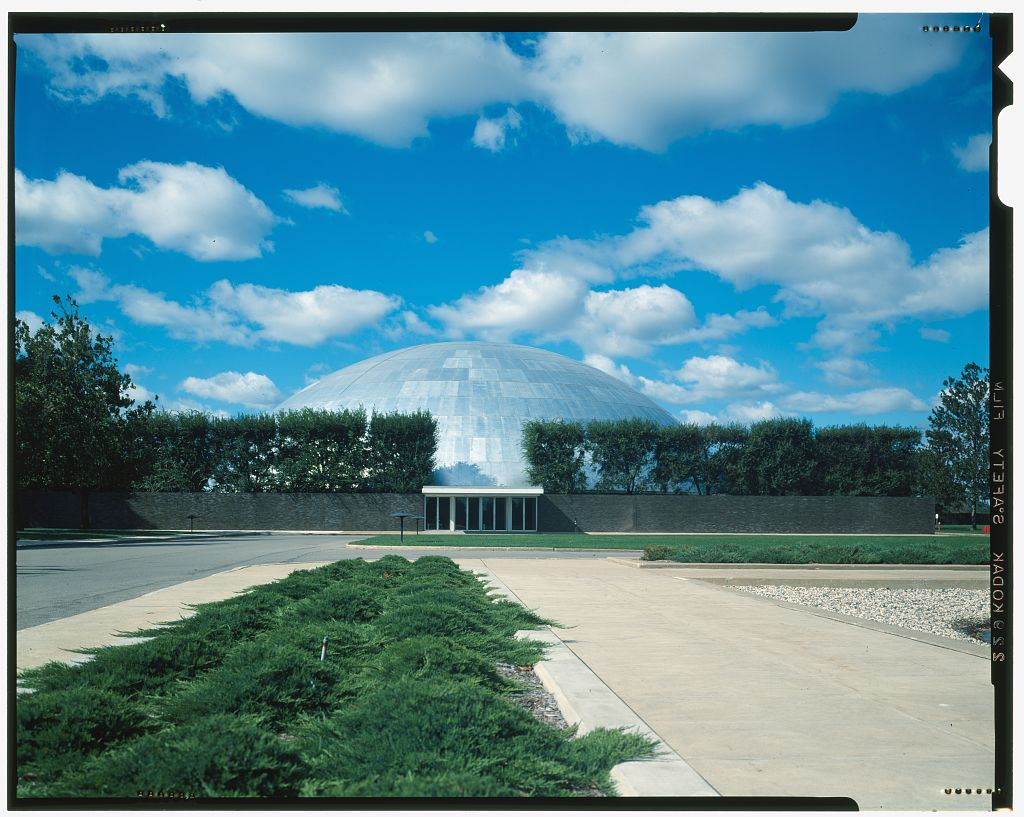
The Design Dome at the General Motors Technical Center, seen in 1956

GM continued to acquire land for the complex through 1954; the final plots cost the company up to $6,000 per acre ($15,000/ha). (Note: Equivalent to $72,000 per acre ($29,000 per hectare) in 2025) By that year, only one of the complex's original departments had not yet moved into its buildings at the GM Tech Center, and some Chevrolet employees had already moved into the Chevrolet complex. Numerous buildings opened in 1954, including a service administration building, process development buildings, and gas turbine test building. Work on the Fisher Body complex continued through 1955. The wind tunnel, the styling buildings, the isotope laboratory, and the Fisher Body buildings all opened that year. After the last structure in the original campus was completed in late 1955, workers landscaped the site through the next year. GM announced in April 1956 that the complex would be dedicated the next month; GM plants across the United States scheduled public open houses to celebrate the complex's completion. On May 15, a day before the scheduled opening, GM officials buried a time capsule on the complex, to be opened 25 years later.

=== Operation ===
The original campus was opened on May 16, 1956, with a ceremony that was broadcast to GM facilities across the United States. Indonesian president Sukarno attended the event, while US president Dwight D. Eisenhower prepared a speech that was read at the ceremony. The facility cost the company approximately $100 million, of which $60 million had been spent on the buildings. (Note: The total cost is equivalent to $0.88 billion, and the buildings' cost is equivalent to $0.53 billion, in 2024) Initially, it spanned 320 acres (130 ha), with 25 structures. (Note: Multiple sources give a figure of both 320 acres and 25 structures. Other sources cite differing figures of 20, 26, or 27 structures. One source gives a slightly different area of 330 acres (130 ha), while also citing a figure of 25 structures.) The Tech Center employed 4,000 people, and its completion prompted other businesses to relocate nearby. The complex was so large that it had its own fire department, hospital, utilities, and 600 maintenance staff. Its presence helped turn Warren into "a mecca for the latest and greatest in the automotive world", as the Detroit Free Press described it.

When it was completed, the Tech Center was used for R&D, allowing GM's subsidiaries to consolidate their R&D activities in one place. In addition to administrative offices, the complex housed GM's research, process development, styling, and engineering departments, four of GM's ten major divisions at the time. Sloan wrote that the Tech Center was intended "not to manufacture products but to promote science, advanced mechanical arts and styling in an atmosphere of study and experimentation". Specialized facilities, such as isotope labs and hot and cold rooms, allowed the research development to test out materials and technologies, along with conducting research on more obscure technologies. Other buildings were used for a wide range of activities; for instance, the engineering division developed things such as transmissions and programming languages at the Tech Center, while the styling division designed their ergonomic vehicle interiors there. New vehicle models were developed there before they were released to the public. The complex also hosted events such as the Feminine Auto Show.

==== Late 1950s to late 1970s ====
GM sought to expand the Tech Center again by 1958, when it began enlarging the engineering division's offices and shop. The next year, GM announced that it would build an office and engineering building for its Ternstedt division at the Technical Center. GM also built utilitarian facilities, such as an incinerator and a storage building, during the late 1950s and early 1960s. The complex employed more than 5,000 people by the early 1960s. GM hosted guided public tours during that time, initially between Memorial Day and Labor Day. The Technical Center's early visitors included the boxer Ingemar Johansson, the animator Walt Disney, the Soviet politician Anastas Mikoyan, King Baudouin of Belgium, King Hussein of Jordan, and Prince Tomislav of Yugoslavia. The Ternstedt buildings, adjacent to the Fisher Body buildings on the east campus, opened in June 1962.

GM expanded its test track at the Tech Center in 1964, at which point the complex had over 7,000 visitors annually from nearly every U.S. state and dozens of countries. The same year, GM announced plans to construct a training center for mechanics, consisting of three wings; the training center opened in mid-1965. GM then announced in 1966 that it would build a three-story computer laboratory at the Tech Center for its research division, which opened two years later as the analysis building. The Facilities Operations Building opened in 1969, and GM announced that year that it would be developing an emission control laboratory at the Chevrolet building cluster. The emission building, along with another storage building, was completed in 1970. The Tech Center continued to operate tours in the early 1970s, with more than ten thousand annual visitors from around the world; visitors were transported by vans that traveled across the complex every hour. In addition, an express bus service to Detroit began serving the Tech Center in 1971. GM announced plans in 1972 for an aerodynamic facility with a new wind tunnel for large vehicles. The aerodynamic lab, which would have been among the world's largest, was delayed during the mid-1970s, amid financial issues.

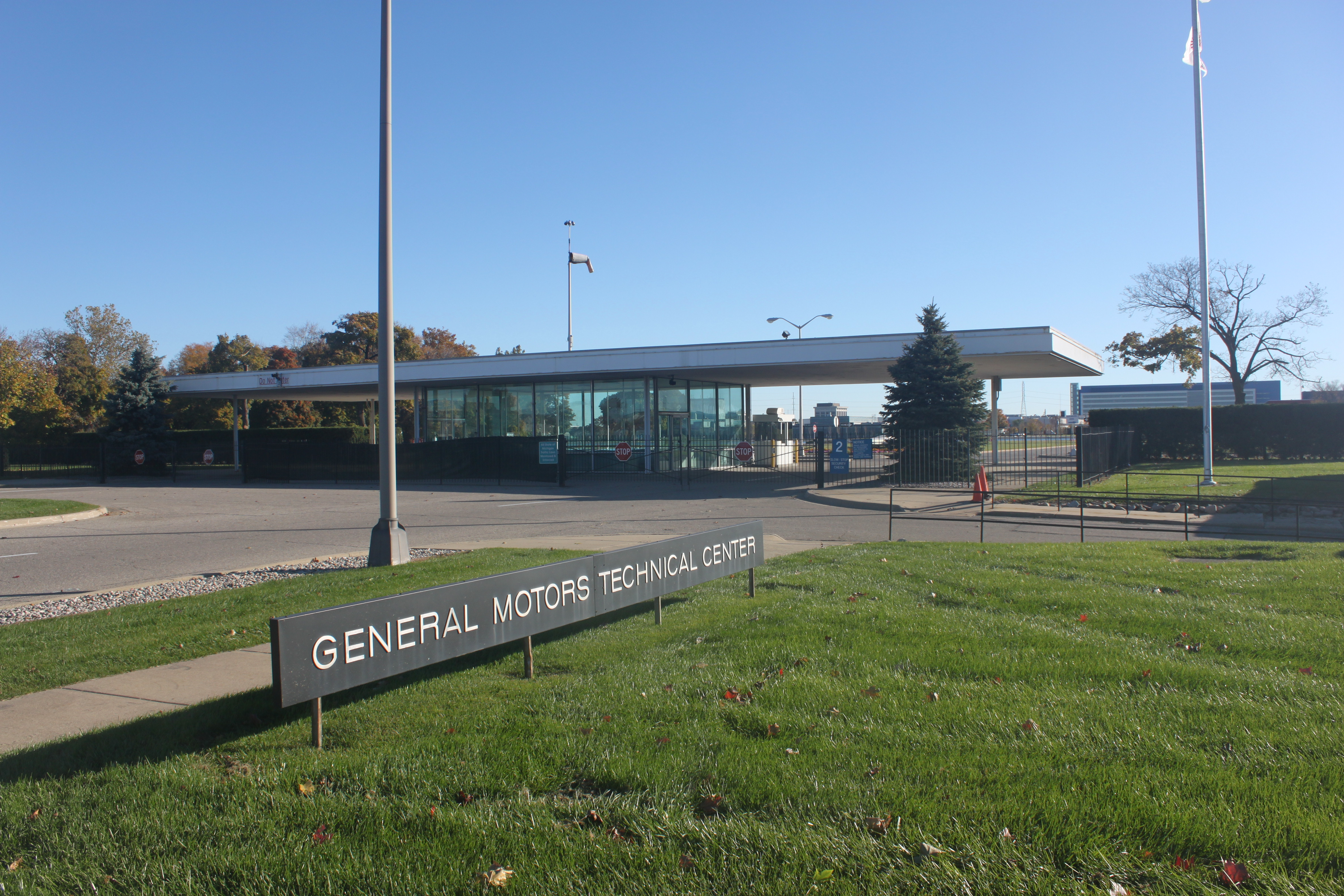
The entrance on Mound Road

As part of an initiative to consolidate offices in Metro Detroit, GM announced in 1977 that it would construct a 285,000-square-foot (26,500 m^{2}) office building for its assembly division at the Tech Center. In addition, GM planned to expand the engineering division's administration building by 200,000 square feet (19,000 m^{2}). A biomedical laboratory for GM's research division opened that year. During 1978, GM announced plans for a service development building at the Tech Center, and the GMISCA building opened. Work on the aerodynamic facility had resumed by 1979, and the service research building was finished that year. The new wind tunnel at the Tech Center was completed in 1980, and the GMAD Building opened the same year. Concurrently, GM conducted medical tests for thousands of employees at the Tech Center, following reports of unusually high incidences of cancer among its workers.

==== 1980s to mid-1990s ====
By the early 1980s, the GM Tech Center had 6,000 employees, and the buildings were valued at nearly $500 million. The complex was still used for research and development, with around 42 structures, and the activities of its employees were largely hidden from the public. Engineering companies competed to work on the product lines there. GM relocated some design functions to a new design studio at Thousand Oaks, California, in 1983, though most design work continued to be conducted in the Warren campus. The General Motors Acceptance Corporation's (GMAC) building on the campus was completed in 1985. During that decade, the Tech Center also housed the Vehicle Assessment Center, where GM staff disassembled competitors' cars for research, as well as a center for the Technology Exchange for Automotive Manufacturing.

A lack of usable space at the Tech Center prompted GM to relocate other divisions nearby during the 1980s, even as hundreds of acres there sat vacant. GM established its Vehicle Launch Center at the complex in 1992 in an attempt to reduce vehicle-development costs. Concurrently, GM relocated most of its executive staff to the Tech Center from the General Motors Building in Detroit. GM renovated one of the Tech Center's engineering buildings beginning in 1994 for $16 million; the Tech Center employed about 20,000 people by then. After buying the Renaissance Center in Detroit in 1996, GM moved some of the Tech Center's divisions there. The same year, GM announced plans to upgrade the Tech Center as part of a $55 million improvement program. Simultaneously, GM consolidated its design staff at the Tech Center and relocated its Small Car Group Operations division there.

Though most of the company's executives worked at the Tech Center by the late 1990s, the complex's large size had become a hindrance. One writer noted that the complex was "too spread out for solid, multi-discipline teamwork", while another reporter stated that GM subsidiaries there seldom communicated and even created competing products. Some of the Tech Center's duties had been moved to 14 sites across Michigan, forcing workers to drive an additional 2 million miles (3.2×10^{6} km) between the various sites annually. GM was also considering constructing a new facility for its Midsize and Luxury Car Group on 312 acres (126 ha) of vacant land, just west of the main complex. The Warren city government supported the proposed expansion. By then, the complex had grown to include 24,000 or 25,000 employees.

==== 1990s and 2000s renovations ====
Ahead of a planned renovation, GM requested a tax abatement for the site in 1997, and Warren's government offered abatements of up to 50%. That August, GM indicated it would spend $50 million on a climatic wind tunnel on the campus. GM formally announced a wide-ranging renovation of the Tech Center in November 1998, seeking to consolidate workers there from across Michigan. The project was to cost $1 billion, including a new wind tunnel and a new building, along with $900 million for renovations to existing space. GM did not want to conduct the renovation without $200 million in city and state tax exemptions, which, if approved, would be the largest tax abatement ever granted in Michigan. Under state law, since Warren was offering a tax abatement, the nearby city of Troy had to approve an "exit visa" allowing GM workers there to relocate to the Tech Center. The Troy City Council voted against the proposal, temporarily delaying the plans. Backlash over the Troy vote led to the repeal of the state law, allowing Warren to approve a $91 million tax incentive for GM.

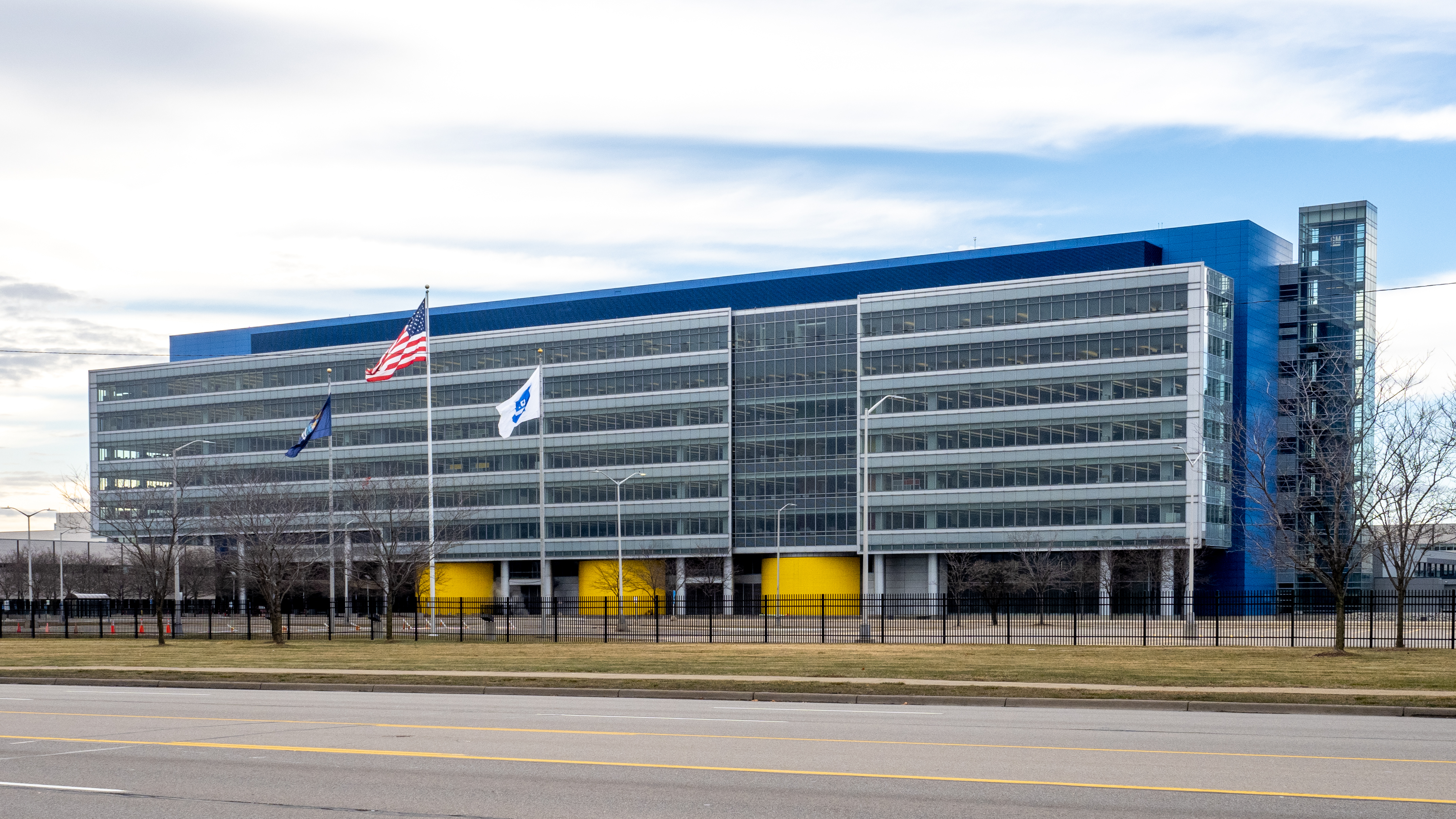
The Vehicle Engineering Center (VEC) Tower

The firms of Kaplan McLaughlin Diaz, Gensler, and Ove Arup & Partners were hired to oversee a master plan, with Hargreaves Associates as landscape architect. Parsons Brinckerhoff was hired to conduct the renovation. The master plan was completed in March 2000. To unite the west and east campuses (which were separated by a railroad track), GM planned to construct a rectangular park known as Saarinen Mall, along with a narrow "zipper" park. Although the company initially contemplated a monorail system for the complex, this proposal was rejected in favor of buses. GM also planned to hire a developer for its 312-acre (126 ha) vacant plot and contemplated opening parts of the complex to the public. Specifically, GM considered constructing community facilities, including baseball fields and open-air gathering spaces, along the eastern boundary on Van Dyke Avenue. Warren police also began patrolling the complex's roads in mid-2000, in conjunction with these changes.

The complex was listed on the National Register of Historic Places in 2000, qualifying it for an estimated $50 million in preservation tax credits. As part of the renovation, GM announced that it would create the Vehicle Engineering Center (VEC), which was to occupy primarily an existing building in the east campus. The VEC also included a $100 million tower adjoining the east lake. The VEC Tower's construction involved partially demolishing an existing building to provide space for the new tower's foundations. The VEC Tower opened in December 2002; the VEC complex itself was dedicated in June 2003 with 2.2 million square feet (200,000 m^{2}) of new or renovated office space. In addition, the existing buildings were restored, a project that was completed by 2004. Grand Sakwa Properties was selected to redevelop GM's vacant tract west of the campus and ultimately bought the tract outright in 2005.

==== Mid-2000s to present ====
During the mid-2000s, GM completed its Global Visualization Center at the Tech Center, and it announced plans for two additional buildings at the complex. GM also remodeled an auditorium at the complex into a design studio. By then, many of the Tech Center's functions were being outsourced overseas. When GM filed for bankruptcy protection in 2009, Warren's mayor offered a 30-year tax exemption on the Tech Center if GM relocated Renaissance Center workers there, a proposal GM ultimately rejected. At the time, the Tech Center had 19,000 employees, with space for 4,000 more. Also in 2009, GM opened an electric vehicle battery research lab at the Tech Center; an expansion of the lab, announced the next year, was completed in 2013. The battery lab projects were partially subsidized by a tax incentive. During the early 2010s, GM built an information technology data center and added a photovoltaic array to the Tech Center. In addition, GM added a bike share system to the campus in 2014.

Numerous buildings at the GM Tech Center were temporarily closed following heavy rains in August 2014, with 30 million US gallons (110,000,000 L; 25,000,000 imp gal) of floodwater reaching up to 7 feet (2.1 m) in some buildings. The flood caused $132 million in damage and prompted GM officials to consider upgrading the complex. In April 2015, GM announced that it would upgrade the Tech Center's body shop and stamping plant for $140 million, and it received a 12-year tax abatement for a wider-ranging renovation. The next month, GM announced that it would spend another $1 billion on a more comprehensive expansion that would add 2,600 jobs. The project included renovating the Design Center's auditorium (known as the Design Dome), refurbishing several facilities, adding a structural development lab and parking garage, and building another wind tunnel. The renovations spurred nearby development and helped increase industrial property values in Warren. By 2017, renovation contractors Walbridge and SmithGroup were about to build a design facility adjoining the Design Dome. In addition, GM began using drones in 2018 to help patrol the campus.

The renovations were completed in the early 2020s, at which point the Tech Center employed 20,000 people. Several of the buildings were upgraded with flexible office spaces, where employees did not work at assigned seats, along with amenity spaces. GM opened its Additive Industrialization Center in the research section in February 2021. That October, GM announced plans for an electric vehicle battery development center, the Wallace Innovation Center, which opened in 2022. GM's Design West complex, adjoining the Design Dome, opened in April 2024. That October, GM announced plans to spend $145 million constructing a battery cell plant on the complex, at Mound and Thirteen Mile roads. GM also relocated many employees to the Tech Center after selling the Renaissance Center that year. At the center's 70th anniversary in 2026, GM President Mark Reuss said the company had spent $2 billion upgrading the complex over the preceding decade.

== Site and layout ==
The Design Dome, originally the styling auditorium

The General Motors Technical Center is located in Warren, Michigan, United States, within Macomb County. The site is bounded by Van Dyke Avenue (M-53) on the east, Chicago Road on the north, Mound Road on the west, and Twelve Mile Road on the south. A small number of buildings lie south of Twelve Mile Road. A railroad right-of-way runs north to south through the site, dividing the Tech Center into west and east campuses, each with a lake at its center. Sources disagree on whether the complex covers 680 acres (280 ha), 704 acres (285 ha), 813 acres (329 ha), or 900 acres (360 ha). The landscape design is largely attributed to Thomas Church, who worked with Eero Saarinen, the architect of the complex's master plan. The complex is closed to the public, and it does not host tours.

The complex is laid out like a college campus. The west campus comprises the original Tech Center and originally included buildings housing five divisions, namely service, process development, and engineering departments to the east; styling to the south; and research departments to the north. Special-purpose buildings, such as a wind tunnel, gas turbine facility, and laboratory for isotopes, are located at the northern end of the west campus. GM originally considered the east campus as a separate facility. The northern section of the east campus was originally left vacant and was developed gradually; the buildings did not share as many architectural features, giving it a less cohesive character. The layout bears some similarities to the grid-like IIT Academic Campus in Chicago, which Saarinen had studied before designing the GM Technical Center. The historian Alice T. Friedman also cited the complex as having Beaux-Arts architectural features, such as linearly-arranged reflecting pools. The scholar Brynnar Swenson wrote that the site design "organized its occupants without concern over their particular identities, but also without overtly dehumanizing them".

Because of the Tech Center's size, it had a dedicated fire department when it opened. To accommodate high utility needs, GM funded an extension of a Detroit water main and built a sewage treatment center on the complex, the latter of which could treat 2 million US gallons (7,600,000 L; 1,700,000 imp gal) per workday. Its steam plant could generate 320,000 pounds (150,000 kg) of steam per hour, and most of the buildings had separate air-conditioning systems. Also on the grounds is a 250,000-US-gallon (950,000 L) water tower, (Note: The water tower is variously cited as 132 feet (40 m), 138 feet (42 m), or 140 feet (43 m) tall.) along with a 1.5-million-US-gallon (5,700,000 L; 1,200,000 imp gal) underground water tank. The complex included 387 miles (623 km) of wires, 56 miles (90 km) of light tubes, 12 miles (19 km) of underfloor air distribution ducts, and 5.5 acres (2.2 ha) of windows. The isotope laboratory has its own drainage system to handle potentially radioactive wastewater. At night, the landscape is illuminated artificially; GM installed 480 kilowatts (640 hp) of lamps in different colors.

=== Green spaces ===
Originally, the Tech Center had 13,000 trees. The landscape design is relatively simple, consisting mostly of low evergreen trees interspersed between buildings; they are arranged in various rows throughout the complex. The "forest trees" at the Tech Center's perimeter and around the west campus's lake are spaced every 15 feet (4.6 m). In other places, trees of the same species were planted on one or both sides of roadways, or within parking lots and lawns. Where double rows of trees were used, the trees in each row were offset from each other. The complex originally included about 300 specimens of larger trees such as crabapples and cherry trees, along with shade trees.

There were also 56,000 groundcover plants, (Note: A fact sheet from GM cites the buildings as having had 55,941 groundcover plants and 3,180 shrubs. Eric J. Hill wrote in 2003 that the complex had 60,000 total plants and shrubs.) including junipers, yews, and other shrubs. As of 2015, the complex had 25,000 trees and 44,000 shrubs. Open lawns are placed throughout the complex. The original west campus contains 150 acres (61 ha) or 155 acres (63 ha) of lawn. In the west campus, the lawns are placed in gaps between each building, visually connecting the west campus's central lake with the spaces along the exterior. Stones are placed around buildings and water features throughout the complex. Until 2005, the Tech Center's grounds also included a 312-acre (126 ha) vacant site abutting the west campus. This site attracted herds of deer and was nicknamed the GM Sanctuary; the deer were later moved to a farm.

Compared with the west campus, the east campus has fewer trees and more vacant land (especially along the perimeter). Some of Saarinen's original landscape features for the east campus were modified in the final plans; these changes did not necessarily fit his original design intentions. For example, a building on the northern side of the east lake was relocated, creating an unoccupied void, and the number of trees was reduced, blunting their visual impact. The east campus has an 8-acre (3.2 ha) lawn, Saarinen Mall, which was formerly a parking lot and is designated as a wildlife habitat by the Wildlife Habitat Council. Saarinen Mall, with 42 plant species, is a continuation of a similar promenade on the west campus.

=== Lakes and pools ===
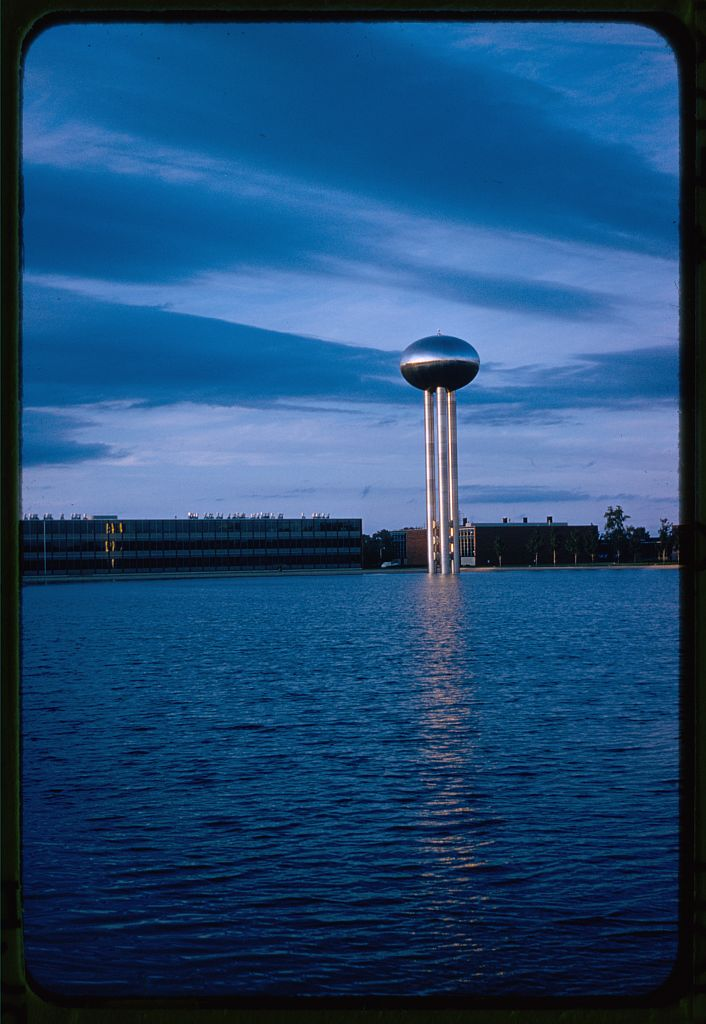
Water tower in the west lake

The lakes are rectangular, like the rest of the complex. Including the reflecting pools, the complex has 38.3 acres (15.5 ha) of water area. Both of the lakes have numerous fish species, and GM employees can engage in catch and release fishing in the lakes.

The 22-acre (89,000 m^{2}) west lake, measuring 1,780 by 560 feet (540 by 170 m) across, includes two fountains. When the Tech Center was completed, one of the west lake's fountains had 21 jets that could be synchronized to shoot water in a pattern. This fountain, designed by Alexander Calder, is located at the west lake's northwest corner. The other, at the south end, was capable of shooting up 115-by-50-foot (35 by 15 m) sheets of water; this fountain could pump 6,000 US gallons (23,000 L; 5,000 imp gal) a minute. There are also four islands along the edge of the west lake, which extend asymmetrically from all sides. The complex's water tower, located in the west lake, has three round supports and a bulbous tank, contrasting with the rectangular designs of the buildings. The water tower and Calder's fountain were both intended to visually compensate for the lack of high-rises in the complex.

Two smaller reflecting pools adjoin the west lake, one of which was originally a lawn. The reflecting pool to the southeast is aligned north–south; it adjoins the engineering division and does not have water features. The reflecting pool to the southwest is aligned west–east and adjoins the design division, with a fountain rising 24 feet (7.3 m). The west lake and both reflecting pools have concrete banks covered in stone. The east lake covers 11 acres (4.5 ha) and is lower than the surrounding ground.

=== Road network ===
The Tech Center's buildings are connected by a network of roads, which originally measured 11 miles (18 km) long and encompassed 18.7 miles (30.1 km) by 2015. When the Technical Center opened, nearly all employees had to drive, as there was only one bus line nearby. The complex was intended to be viewed primarily from vehicles. As a result of the complex's car-centric design and massive size, Saarinen described it as being designed to "automobile scale". The streets divide the complex into large rectangular blocks. A ring road surrounds the lake; the original ring road has been modified over the years with the addition of a roundabout and the removal of a parking area. The complex's sidewalks and pedestrian paths run primarily next to the roadways; as of 2015, there were 25.5 miles (41.0 km) of pedestrian paths and 1.3 miles (2.1 km) of pedestrian underpasses. A vehicular test track runs along the eastern edge of the original building.

Spread across the complex are rectangular parking lots surrounded by trees; some of the larger parking lots are interrupted at regular intervals by hedges and trees. The parking lots originally covered 85 acres (34 ha) and could fit 2,000 vehicles. As of 2015, the parking lots covered 174 acres (70 ha). Within the original campus, they are largely located in the rear of each main group of buildings and are illuminated by clamshell-shaped lamps. The parking lots also function as landscape features, complementing the axes created by the trees, roads, and lakes. Fences surround the complex, and gates at each vehicular entrance prevent the general public from entering. A parking deck, completed in 2002, occupies the site of two original outbuildings.

== Architecture and design ==
There are 15 clusters of buildings, along with numerous minor outbuildings not part of any cluster. The complex initially had seven building clusters, seven standalone buildings, and numerous outbuildings designed between 1949 and 1956 by Eero Saarinen in conjunction with GM subsidiary Argonaut Realty. Saarinen designed five clusters in the original west campus and was a consultant for the Chevrolet and Fisher Body building clusters in the east campus, which Argonaut designed. For the buildings he designed, Saarinen was assisted by several employees, including Kevin Roche and John Dinkeloo. After the original complex's dedication, a second phase with eight more structures was constructed between 1957 and 1970, and a third phase with seven structures between 1974 and 1985; Argonaut designed all of these structures, except one designed by Saarinen. By the 2010s, the complex had 38 buildings.

The buildings are designed in the mid-century modern style, intended to contrast with the grimy appearance of contemporary factories. They are aligned with the site's overall grid, running perpendicular or parallel to each other. GM designed many of the interiors, giving them an automotive feel. In addition to the main buildings and outbuildings, Saarinen designed three gatehouses, with two at Mound Road and one at Twelve Mile Road; one of the Mound Road gatehouses has been removed. Many records relating to the design process are stored in GM's archives.

=== Design features ===
The bricks are painted different colors to distinguish buildings from each other.

Saarinen included similar architectural features in the buildings. His designs across the campus generally have linear decorative details and industrial materials, along with low, rectangular massings. The Tech Center's original buildings are generally low-rise structures, no more than three stories high. According to Friedman, the designs were influenced by Saarinen's contemporaries and collaborators, such as Eliel Saarinen, Charles Eames, and Mies. Saarinen also drew inspiration from older styles.

Saarinen used several materials in the buildings, such as metal and glass, that were reminiscent of materials used in automobiles. The complex included several unusual architectural features for its time, including glass curtain walls, colorful glazed-brick walls, flexible offices, and built-in climate control systems. Saarinen continued to tweak the various design features throughout the development process, collaborating with GM staff on many of these features. For instance, GM staff developed the technology for the buildings' window gaskets and glazed-brick walls. The visual impact of the design was blunted by the buildings' extreme lengths, which sometimes exceeded 3,000 feet (910 m).

==== Exteriors ====
Saarinen's Tech Center buildings generally include a taller administration wing in front of a shorter lab or workshop; the Design Dome (originally the styling division auditorium) was the most notable deviation from the overall plan. In the original campus, the curtain walls are made of steel I-beams, glass windows, and porcelain enameled steel panels. The visible portions of the beams are painted black, while the glass windows and enameled steel panels are of uniform color. The curtain walls measure 2 inches (51 mm) thick and provide the same amount of insulation as a masonry wall several times thicker. The glass panes are double-glazed and surrounded by neoprene gaskets, which are set into the metal window frames in a similar manner to windshields. The two layers of glass are separated by a small gap. The spandrel panels, between each window, consist of a Kraft paper honeycomb slab sandwiched between two layers of enameled steel panels. The honeycomb core separates the outer and inner layers of enameled steel, providing both electrical and thermal insulation. The curtain wall panels are affixed to aluminum flaps that are extruded from the steel I-beams.

The ends of each building have panels of glazed brick, which are painted in nine or eleven colors. The different colors of bricks distinguished the structures from one another and broke up the otherwise-uniform design of the curtain wall, though they did not represent anything specific. Saarinen selected the colors because they were similar to "autumn leaves [reflecting] afternoon sun". The bricks' design was also intended to contrast with the uniformity of the windows and enameled steel panels. The technology for the glazed walls was devised by Maija Grotell, a ceramic artist at Saarinen's alma mater, Cranbrook Academy of Art. The bricks were glazed to prevent the pigmentation from washing off, a technology that Saarinen claimed would allow the colors to remain for thousands of years.

Compared with the older buildings on the west campus, the buildings on the east campus are larger and more utilitarian, their designs dictated primarily by interior use. The east campus buildings' facades are made of steel panels, windows, and white brick interspersed between I-beams. When the Fisher Body and Chevrolet complexes were built in the mid-1950s, shortly after the original complex, they used similar features, although their facades were white and black. The Fisher Body and Chevrolet buildings' cost per square foot was about two-thirds that of the original complex. Many of the buildings completed in the late 1950s and the 1960s were built in even simpler styles resembling the original architecture. Structures constructed after the Emissions Building, which was completed in 1970, bore little to no resemblance to Saarinen's original design.

==== Interiors ====
The buildings are arranged modularly on 5-foot (1.5 m) grids; buildings for different departments use varying numbers of modules. The modules are wider than those in other buildings of the time, which tended to use 4-foot-wide (1.2 m) grids. Each major building has a lobby centered on a large staircase, with ample space to display products. Different buildings have distinct staircase designs and color palettes, which, along with other design features, were intended to "carry the future into the scientist's work chamber" as The New York Times described it. The interiors use industrial materials and furniture by such designers as Harry Bertoia, Florence Knoll, and Charles and Ray Eames, along with lighting designs from Richard Kelly. Saarinen used color even inside utilitarian buildings, such as the power plant, where the pipes and other equipment are color-coded. Some buildings, such as the research administration building, had ornate features to distinguish them from each other.

Spaces have varying dimensions, materials, and arrangements to accommodate each department's needs. Some interior partitions are made of glass and enameled steel, similar to the materials on the facade, to eliminate what Saarinen called the "impression of joining". The ceilings of the original office buildings are built to a 5 1/6-foot (1.6 m) grid and contain lighting, embedded air-conditioning ducts, sprinkler heads, and sockets for movable partitions. The office buildings contain long triangular trusses that span the open-plan spaces, eliminating the need for interior columns. The east campus buildings use similar modular grids to the original campus. The Fisher Body and Chevrolet complexes use similar interior-design features to the original campus, including color-coded interiors and partitioned offices.

=== Artwork ===
Saarinen incorporated numerous artworks in the design of the complex. Calder was responsible for the fountain jets in the west lake, which were programmed to shoot water in choreographed patterns that he labeled Fantails, Plops, Scissors, and Seven Sisters. Antoine Pevsner designed the sculpture The Flight of the Bird, also known as Bird in Flight, at the south end of the west lake, above the entrance to the Design Center. In addition, Bertoia designed a screen for the complex's dining area, colored in gold and measuring 36 by 10 feet (11.0 by 3.0 m) across. The complex also includes paintings by Charles Sheeler and Jimmy Ernst, along with murals and sculptures by figures such as Gere Kavanaugh, Gwen Lux, and Buell Mullen. The Design West complex has 40 paintings and other works of art by employees of GM's design division.

== List of buildings ==
Building name	Location (Note: Addresses are published in National Park Service 2000, pp. 3–6, unless otherwise stated. A map of each building's relative position is published in National Park Service 2000, p. 151. For other buildings, refer to sources in "Notes" section.)	Campus (Note: Buildings south of Twelve Mile Road are labeled as "South".)	Architect (Note: See references for each building in "Notes" column.)	Date completed	Description and features (Note: The "standard curtain wall" refers to the curtain wall of glass, enameled steel, and steel (as described in the § Design features section).)	Notes (Note: Buildings marked as "NRHP" are contributing properties in the complex's 2000 National Register of Historic Places listing.)
7000 Building / GMISCA Building	7000 Chicago Road 42.5227°N 83.0330°W	East	Argonaut	1978	Includes two wings: Original structure: A 1-story building made of concrete. It was expanded south in 1987.; Administration building (1980): A 3-story building made of concrete, with horizontal windows, north of the original 7000 Building.	
Aerodynamics Laboratory	6363 East Twelve Mile Road 42.5071°N 83.0425°W	West	Argonaut	1979	A 3-story building with a standard curtain wall on one side and glazed blue bricks on the others. Wind tunnels to the west and east are made of concrete. The wind tunnels measure 70 feet (21 m) in diameter and 926 feet (282 m) long.	
Anker-Johnson Engineering / GM Management Training Center / Chevrolet School of Merchandising & Management	7500 Chicago Road 42.5230°N 83.0308°W	East	Argonaut	1965	Includes three wings of 1 to 2 stories, The facade is made of concrete and I-beams, with a perforated-concrete wall at the main entrance to the northeast. The interior spans 82,500 square feet (7,660 m^{2}) with classrooms, conference rooms, a lounge, a dining room, and an auditorium. A glass atrium connects the wings, and there are garages to the southwest.	NRHP
Cadillac Headquarters / GMAD Building	30009 Van Dyke Avenue 42.5190°N 83.0354°W	East	Argonaut	1980	Includes three wings: Administration building: A 3-story wing with concrete facade and horizontal windows.; Shop: A 1 1/2-story wing accessed from the administration building via glass atrium.; Shop annex (1983): A 2-story wing.	
Central Mail Building / Incinerator	6450 East Twelve Mile Road 42.5031°N 83.0393°W	South	Argonaut	1958	A 1-story building with concrete-block facades, clerestory windows, a garage door, and a protruding roof. Inside is an open-plan space.	NRHP
Central Restaurant	30250 Mound Road (east side of the west lake) 42.5120°N 83.0389°W	West	Eero Saarinen	1955	A 1 1/2-story building with glazed facades on three sides; glazed black bricks at eastern ends of north and south facades; and loading dock on east facade. The flat concrete roof has deep eaves. Inside is a slightly raised dining area with a Bertoia-designed screen.	NRHP
Chevrolet Central Office / Ternstedt Offices & Engineering	30007 Van Dyke Avenue 42.5190°N 83.0314°W	East	Argonaut	1962	Includes two wings with facades made of white brick, enameled steel, glass, and I-beams. Four smokestacks are placed on the facade, while the interior spans 617,000 square feet (57,300 m^{2}).: Administration building: A 3-story wing with a first-floor executive suite, a first-floor cafeteria, and offices. A detached lobby connects to the rest of the building via a glass hallway.; Shop: A 1 1/2-story wing with open-plan offices and a vehicle testing lab.	NRHP
Cole Engineering Center / Vehicle Engineering Center (VEC) / Fisher Body Engineering	30001 Van Dyke Avenue 42.5110°N 83.0317°W	East	Argonaut	1955	Includes two wings connected by sky bridges, with a loading area between them. Both wings were expanded in 1972. The interior spans 1,301,000 square feet (120,900 m^{2}).: Administration building: A 2-story structure with set-back penthouse. The facade is made of white brick, enameled steel, and glass; the north side has a protruding lobby. Inside are a lobby, executive offices, utilitarian workspaces, and four courtyards.; Shop: A 1 1/2-story structure south of the administration building, with open-plan workshop space.	NRHP
Design Center / Styling Group	30100 Mound Road (south side of the west lake) 42.5092°N 83.0425°W	West	Eero Saarinen (original) Argonaut (later renovations)	1955	Includes five wings, which span over 225,000 square feet (20,900 m^{2}) combined.: Administration building: A 3-story wing with a standard curtain wall on ground floor and hidden beams on upper floors. The entrance leads to a lobby with floating stairs, which descends into a pool. The rest of the building is occupied by offices and workshops, with a cafeteria and private dining room on third floor.; Garage: A 1-story wing north of the administration building. It has a glazed yellow brick facade and a color design studio on the roof.; Studio & shop building: A 2-story wing with a standard curtain wall facade. It includes large open-plan workshops and a library; there were originally 16 studios.; Auditorium/Design Dome: A freestanding structure linked to the other wings via a tunnel. It has a facade of glazed panels and is surrounded by a courtyard. The aluminum-clad dome, made of two layers of steel plates, measures 65 feet (20 m) tall and 188 feet (57 m) across. (Note: These dimensions are given by numerous sources. Some sources give a slightly different diameter of 185 feet (56 m) or 186 feet (57 m).); Fabrication building (1968): A 1 1/2- story wing with glazed yellow bricks on one side and curtain walls on other sides.	NRHP
Design West	30100 Mound Road (west side of the west lake) 42.5096°N 83.0450°W	West	SmithGroup	2024	A building with 360,000 square feet (33,000 m^{2}) of space, wrapping around the Design Center's auditorium on three sides. The building has full-height windows and has a floor plan shaped like a bracket. Inside are facilities such as 3D modeling and design visualization labs.	
Emissions Building	30003 Van Dyke Avenue 42.5134°N 83.0374°W	East	Argonaut	1970	A 1 1/2-story building with a facade of white brick, enameled steel, glass, and I-beams. Inside are an open-plan garage and offices.	NRHP
Estes Engineering Center / Powertrain Engineering Center / Chevrolet Engineering	30001 Van Dyke Avenue 42.5142°N 83.0347°W	East	Argonaut	1955	Built with three wings, all with facades made of white brick, enameled steel, glass, and I-beams. A fourth wing (built 1961, expanded 1968) occupies a courtyard that formerly separated the experimental building and test laboratory.: Engineering building: A 3-story wing with a patio, lobby, auditorium, and offices. This wing includes a dining room overlooking a sunken garden.; Test laboratory: A 1 1/2-story wing with smokestacks on its facade. Inside is a central corridor flanked by test cells.; Experimental building: A 1 1/2-story wing with an open-plan shop area.	NRHP
Facilities Operations / Service Section Building	6250 Chicago Road 42.5231°N 83.0421°W	West	Argonaut	1969	Includes two wings: Administration building: A 2-story rectangular structure with brown brick and exposed beams on the facade; the main facade has windows, along with a canopy. Inside is a lobby with a stair leading up to open-plan offices.; Shop: A 1 1/2- story wing with brown brick and exposed beams on the facade, and an open-plan space inside.	NRHP
Gate House – Main Entrance	Mound Road northbound at Eero Saarinen Boulevard 42.5117°N 83.0457°W	West	Eero Saarinen	1955	Located in a median, with a glazed facade and a flat concrete roof overhanging the driveways on either side. Inside, a stair leads to a basement. There are parking lots to the north and south, and a helipad at one corner.	NRHP
Gate House – Twelve Mile Road	Twelve Mile Road at William Durant Boulevard 42.5066°N 83.0405°W	West	Eero Saarinen	1951	Consists of two parts. The roadways are covered by a canopy flanked by glazed red or orange-brick piers. The median between the roadways has a small structure with a glazed facade.	NRHP
General Storage Building #1	6424 East Twelve Mile Road 42.5045°N 83.0387°W	South	Argonaut	1961	A 1 1/2-story building with brown bricks, black beams, clerestory windows, and canopies over entrances. Inside are offices and an open-plan warehouse area.	NRHP
General Storage Building #2	6464 East Twelve Mile Road 42.5031°N 83.0408°W	South	Argonaut	1972	A 1-story warehouse building with a cinder-block and corrugated-metal facade, vertical windows, and an open-plan warehouse area.	
Global Portfolio Development (GPD) Center / Engineering Group	30200 Mound Road (southeast corner of the west lake) 42.5097°N 83.0395°W	West	Eero Saarinen (original) Argonaut (later renovations)	1950	Includes six wings: Administration building: A 3-story building with a standard curtain wall and glazed crimson brick. It includes a protruding glass lobby and open-plan workspaces. When the building opened, a service shaft with a vehicle elevator connected it to the shop.; Shop: A 1 1/2-story building. The interior is a mostly open-plan space; it was originally composed of central corridor flanked by open workshops, but one of the shops has become offices. It was expanded in 1959 and 1980; the latter addition is 3 stories, with a curtain wall differing from the existing architecture.; Dynamometer building: A wing extending east from shop, with standard curtain wall, glazed orange brick, and exhaust stacks on the facade. It includes central corridor flanked by dynamometer cells, with separate ventilation systems for testing and non-testing purposes. It was expanded in 1956, and the connection to the shop was expanded in 1973 and 1979.; Fuel blend building: A wing north of the dynamometer building, physically separated from other wings. It has a facade of steel beams, enameled steel, and glazed red brick.; IS&S integration center (1973): A wing extending east from the shop, it has standard curtain wall with glazed orange brick and exhaust stacks.; South administration building (1959): A 3-story building with a standard curtain wall and glazed crimson brick. It includes a protruding glass lobby and open-plan workspaces.	NRHP
Manufacturing A / Process Development Group	30300 Mound Road (east side of the west lake) 42.5136°N 83.0395°W	West	Eero Saarinen	1954	Includes two wings, separated by a single-story passageway.: Administration building: A 3-story wing with a glazed blue brick facade, protruding glass lobby, and open-plan workspaces (formerly offices and drafting rooms).; Shop and foundry: A 1-story, open-plan space behind the administration building.	NRHP
Manufacturing B, C / Service Group	30400 Mound Road (northeast corner of the west lake) 42.5159°N 83.0395°W	West	Eero Saarinen (original) Argonaut (later renovations)	1954	Includes six wings: Administration building: A 2-story wing with glazed blue brick facade, with canopy over entrance. It contains a lobby, suspended stair, and open plan offices. It was expanded in 1970.; Garage: A low-rise building with a glazed orange brick facade.; Shop: A 1-story wing behind the administration building, with a glazed blue brick facade. It was expanded in 1970.; Steam/chilled water plant: A 3-story wing with glazed red glazed facade. The interior has been converted into an open plan space. It was expanded in 1970.; North administration building (1970): A wing with a standard curtain wall, glazed blue brick walls, and winding path on north end.; Coatings lab (1987): A wing located east of the shop; its curtain wall differs from the existing architecture.	NRHP
Parts Fabrication Building	6400 East Twelve Mile Road 42.5048°N 83.0404°W	South	Argonaut	c. 1951–1952	A 1 1/2-story building with brown bricks, black beam, and clerestory windows. Inside are a lobby, office spaces, and open-plan shop area. It was renovated in 1985. An outbuilding and a garage associated with the Parts Fabrication Building have both been demolished.	
Primary Switch House	29999 Van Dyke Avenue 42.5115°N 83.0363°W	East	Argonaut	1955	A 1-story building with a facade made of white brick, enameled steel, and glass.	NRHP
Research Center	30500 Mound Road (north of the west lake) 42.5166°N 83.0426°W	West	Eero Saarinen (pre-1961 buildings) Argonaut (later renovations)	1955	Includes eight wings, some connected by glass corridors. The shop and foundry wings behind the administration building wing are sometimes considered as one structure.: Administration building: A 3-story wing with a standard curtain wall and glazed crimson brick facade. It contains a lobby, 230-seat auditorium, and executive offices on the first floor; machinery and cafeteria in the basement; and library on the third floor. The lobby has a granite spiral staircase designed by Kevin Roche, supported by thin cylindrical rods.; Research services/research processing building: A 1 1/2-story wing with a standard curtain wall and open plan interior. It was expanded northwest in 1970.; Research engineering laboratory: A U-shaped structure extending north of the research services building, with a facade of glazed royal-blue brick, clerestory windows, and roof smokestacks. There are laboratories in both wings of the "U" and a landscaped garden between wings.; Fuel blend building: A standalone building, physically separated from other wings, with a glazed crimson brick facade and small windows. It was expanded west in 1973.; Metallurgical building: A 2-story steel frame structure. The center bay has glazed north and south facades, with a foundry inside, while the outer bays have glazed orange brick.; Research engineering building (1961): A structure with glazed facades on the north and south and glazed red-brick walls on west and east.; Analysis building (1968, 1973): Identical in design to the research engineering building.; Mechanical building (1974): Identical in design to the research engineering building.	NRHP
Research Chemical/Isotope Laboratory	30500 Mound Road 42.5207°N 83.0410°W	West	Argonaut	1954	A 1-story H-shaped structure with exposed steel and concrete panels, brick walls at either end, glass clerestory windows, and a canopy over the main entrance. Inside are laboratories with concrete partitions and other rooms with metal partitions. It was expanded in 1969.	NRHP
Research Safety, Health, & Environment / Biomedical Lab	30500 Mound Road 42.5209°N 83.0392°W	West	Argonaut	1977	A 1-story concrete building with horizontal windows, an overhanging roof, and a canopy to the west.	
Research Engineering Lab North / Gas Turbine Test Building	30500 Mound Road 42.5197°N 83.0392°W	West	Eero Saarinen or Argonaut (Note: National Park Service 2000, p. 23, says that Saarinen may have been involved in Research Engineering Lab North's early design but that Argonaut may have been involved in the final design; however, the architect is not known for certain.)	1952	A 1 1/2-story structure with glass panels in metal frames on two elevations, concrete walls on two elevations, and smokestacks to the east. Inside are engine test cells, while adjacent is a brick pumping house. It was expanded north c. 1977–1978.	NRHP
Service Technology/Service Research Building	30501 Van Dyke Avenue 42.5217°N 83.0305°W	East	Argonaut	1979	A 1 1/2-story structure with a square floor plan, concrete facade, and horizontal windows.	
Sewage Plant	Mound Road and Twelve Mile Road 42.5073°N 83.0446°W	West	Eero Saarinen	c. 1951–1952	A small structure with a curtain wall on one side and glazed brick on the others.	NRHP; later demolished
VEC Tower	30001 Van Dyke Avenue 42.5126°N 83.0313°W	East	Kaplan McLaughlin Diaz	2003	An 8-story building spanning 960,000 square feet (89,000 m^{2}).	
VEC West	30001 Van Dyke Avenue 42.5114°N 83.0348°W	East	Argonaut Smith, Hinchman and Grylls (consulting architect)	1955	A 1 1/2-story structure. The facade is made of white brick, enameled steel, and glass; the north side has a protruding lobby.	NRHP
Wallace Battery Cell Innovation Center	East of Wind Tunnel 42.5199°N 83.0402°W	West	Ghafari Associates	2022	A two-story, 308,000-square-foot (28,600 m^{2}) structure for battery cell production.	
Waste Treatment/Hazardous Waste Building	29999 Van Dyke Avenue 42.5114°N 83.0363°W	East	Argonaut	1955	A 1-story building with a facade made of white brick, enameled steel, and glass.	NRHP
Water Pumping Plant	Mound Road and Twelve Mile Road 42.5073°N 83.0446°W	West	Eero Saarinen	c. 1951–1952	A small structure with a curtain wall on one side and glazed brick on the others.	NRHP; later demolished
Wind Tunnel	30600 Mound Road 42.5196°N 83.0424°W	West	Argonaut	1953	The original 1-story building had a standard curtain wall on one side and glazed blue bricks on the others; it was replaced in 1997 with a steel-framed structure clad in aluminum panels. Wind tunnels to the north and south, still extant, are made of concrete.	
Worldwide Purchasing Building / GMAC Building	6750 Chicago Road 42.5231°N 83.0370°W	East	Argonaut	1985	A 1-story structure with a curtain wall on one side and a concrete facade with horizontal windows on the others.	

== Impact ==
=== Reception ===
==== Contemporary ====
When the initial plans were announced, Architectural Record said that "the much-heralded World of Tomorrow seems a bit less ephemeral" with the design of the Tech Center. Architectural Forum, writing about the revised plans, said the design recalled the "soft melody" of Saarinen's father's design for the Cranbrook Educational Community, despite the differing building arrangements and materials. Henry-Russell Hitchcock and Arthur Drexler of the Museum of Modern Art wrote in 1952 that the repeating elements of Saarinen's design was reminiscent of Mies's work, though elements such as the smokestacks and colored-brick walls helped enliven the design. Aline B. Louchheim, who profiled Saarinen for a New York Times article in 1953 and later married him, wrote in her profile that Saarinen had been "internationally praised for his design" for GM. Louchheim later wrote that the buildings resembled "an exalted industrial product" and that the complex demonstrated Saarinen's practice of using varying decorations to give each building a unique appearance.

Initial commentary on the Tech Center was mostly positive, despite mixed reactions to Saarinen's custom of collaborating with his clients. When the complex was dedicated, a writer for the Boston Globe described the interiors as having "a quiet elegance that bespeaks adequate funds as well as architectural good taste". The Lansing State Journal said the complex combined "beauty with practicality, functionalism with flexibility for the advancement of science and technology", while The New York Times called the buildings "a campus in Technicolor", citing the complex as one of the US's prominent research and laboratory compounds. The Washington Post called the buildings "an architectural fantasy of steel, aluminum, glass and multi-colored brick". An article in Life magazine dubbed the Tech Center as the "Versailles of Industry", a sentiment echoed by several other media sources. When Saarinen died in 1961, one newspaper said he had perceived the commission as "his greatest opportunity", and The Christian Science Monitor said the complex's "awesome dual-carburetor precision" could have only come from "the most methodical of draftsmen".

==== Retrospective ====
Writers have described the Tech Center as one of Saarinen's best-known works, alongside such structures as the CBS Building, Dulles International Airport Main Terminal, Gateway Arch, and TWA Flight Center. The Detroit Free Press called it "a marriage of good design and innovative technique" in 2003, and a guidebook that year said that "much of the newer work seems ungainly after the serene splendor of the original". The New York Times said the next year that the complex "has maintained its futuristic air", while another writer for the same paper said the design "represents the last era in which GM was actually a design leader". Nicolai Ouroussoff of the Times characterized it as an early deviation from the predominant "form follows function" design philosophy. Other observers described the design as reflecting GM's corporate identity and said it highlighted the diversity and degree of customization in Saarinen's designs. Conversely, Jayne Merkel said in 2006 that the buildings' large sizes made the design "overwhelming" and detracted from the individual details.

Upon GM's centennial in 2008, Automotive News said the complex had long "been extolled as a fitting place for technological visions to spring into reality", but that it could have just as easily been a nondescript, utilitarian campus. Alice T. Friedman, writing in 2010, called it "a dazzling demonstration of what a glamorous American modernism could be". Friedman and the preservation organization Docomomo International said that the water tower contributed to the complex's "'camera-ready' pictorial sleekness". Brynnar Swenson wrote in 2015 that the Tech Center "is a monument to the postwar corporation" and that it "highlights how important managerial and technical labor would become for this new economic form". A 2026 article for Wallpaper magazine stated that the design "still has the power to impress" because of both the small architectural details and the complex's massive scale.

=== Architectural influence and media ===
According to Michigan Modern, although Alfred Sloan, Charles Kettering, and Thomas Church were all prominent figures in the Tech Center's development, the complex's architectural significance lies mainly in its association with Eero Saarinen. The Tech Center was Saarinen's first major independent project, as he had previously worked mostly under his father. With the Tech Center, Saarinen began developing a style distinct from that of his father's firm. John L. Dorman, writing for The New York Times in 2018, said the buildings demonstrated how Saarinen had become a successful architect in his own right.

Following the GM commission, Saarinen expanded his architectural practice and went on to design the Bell Labs, IBM Rochester, IBM Watson, and John Deere campuses; Friedman described these projects as having signified a more mainstream acceptance of Saarinen's work. According to Jayne Merkel, the IBM Rochester commission was the only one of these that Saarinen had received as a direct result of the Tech Center project. The complex inspired similar office campuses around the U.S., and Merkel cites the complex as having popularized the "completely controlled environment" that characterized many late-20th-century office buildings. Saarinen's own office in Bloomfield Hills, Michigan, was patterned after the Tech Center's building, while Warren's city hall, across from the Tech Center, incorporated a red arm on its roof to complement the Tech Center's height and design.

During its construction, the Tech Center was extensively discussed in the architectural press, with at least eighteen articles detailing it. When the Tech Center was completed, one issue of Time magazine had a cover depicting Saarinen's face overlaid on a map of the complex. A model of the complex was displayed at the American pavilion for Expo 58 in Brussels, and the complex was also detailed in the 2019 book Where Today Meets Tomorrow by Susan Skarsgard. In addition, it was shown in the 2014 action film Transformers: Age of Extinction.

=== Awards and landmark designations ===
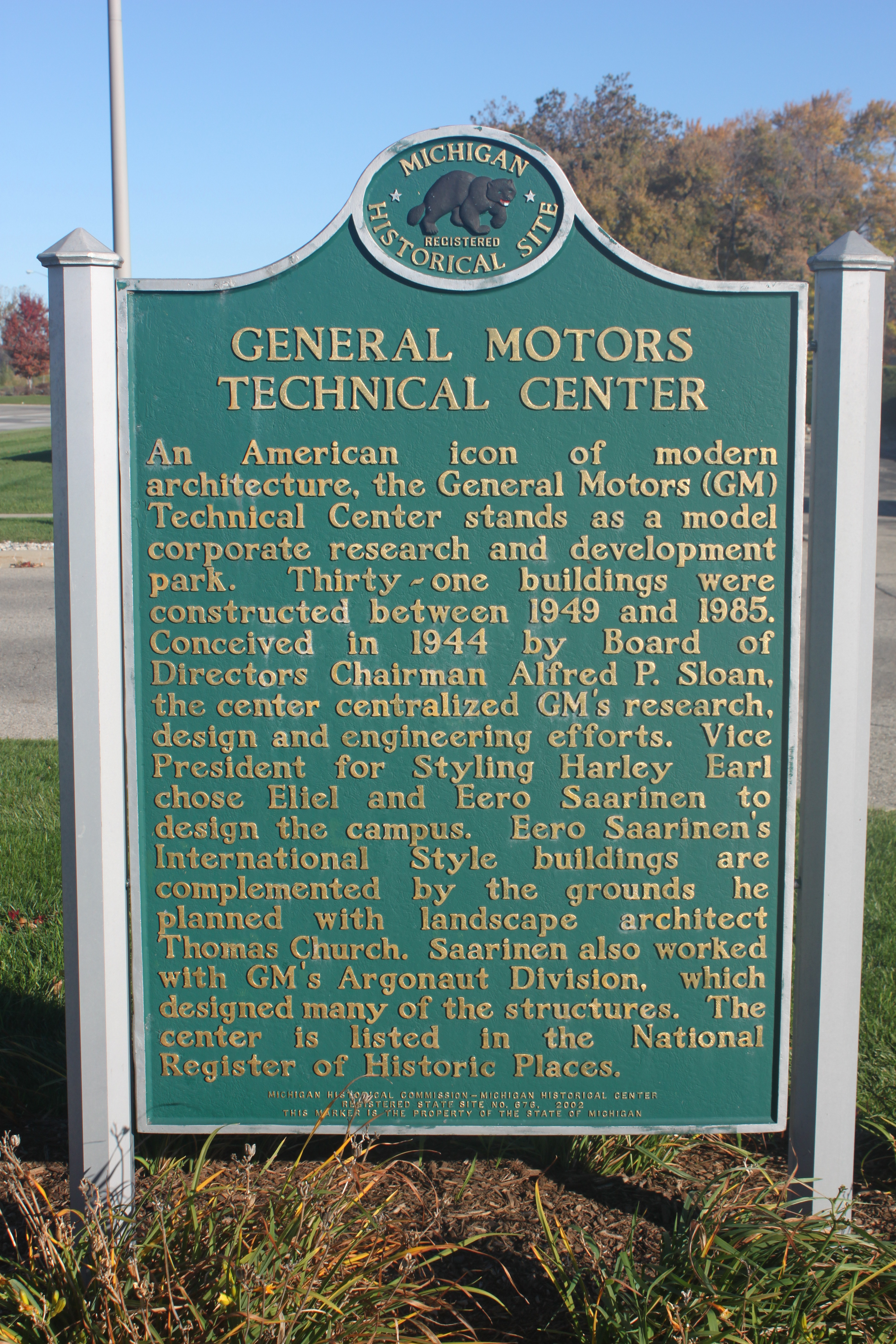
Historic marker at the Tech Center

In 1953, the American Institute of Architects gave the complex an honor award for being an "outstanding example of modern American architecture". Saarinen received a design award from the AIA in 1955 for his design of the complex's Central Restaurant Building. The AIA also gave the General Motors Technical Center its Twenty-five Year Award in 1985, making the complex one of six Saarinen designs that received that award between 1969 and 1993. In granting the award, AIA panelists described the complex as "a symbol of architecture as an embodiment of corporate idealism and optimism".

The buildings were added to the National Register of Historic Places (NRHP) on March 27, 2000, and became a Michigan State Historic Site on January 17, 2002. In addition, the complex was re-added to the NRHP as a National Historic Landmark (NHL) in September 2014 for its architectural significance. Twenty-two buildings are contributing properties to the complex's 2000 NRHP designation, and thirteen buildings are contributing properties to the 2014 NHL designation. A granite marker commemorating the NHL designation was dedicated in August 2015.

== See also ==
- List of works by Eero Saarinen
- List of National Historic Landmarks in Michigan
- National Register of Historic Places listings in Macomb County, Michigan
- Canadian Technical Centre
