= Hydraulic seal =

A hydraulic seal is a relatively soft, non-metallic ring, captured in a groove or fixed in a combination of rings, forming a seal assembly, to block or separate fluid in reciprocating motion applications. Hydraulic seals are vital in machinery. They provide a way for fluid power to be converted to linear motion.

== Materials ==
Hydraulic seals can be made from a variety of materials such as polyurethane, rubber or PTFE. The type of material is determined by the specific operating conditions or limits due to fluid type, pressure, fluid chemical compatibility or temperature.

== Classification ==
Hydraulic seals are classified based on their function and working conditions:

Static

A static hydraulic seal is located in a groove and sees no movement - only sealing within its confined space, acting like a gasket. To achieve this the gasket should be under pressure. The pressure is applied by tightening of the bolts. Examples of static seals include O-rings, flange seals, and cover seals.

Dynamic

This type of seal is exposed to movement.

Rod seal:

Is installed on the piston rod of a hydraulic cylinder. Prevents leakage of hydraulic fluid to the outside of the sealing system. Helps prevent contamination from entering the hydraulic system (in conjunction with a wiper seal).

Piston seal:

Is installed on the piston head. Prevents fluid from crossing the area of the piston head. Ensures that fluid does not leak from the cylinder and adequate pressure is maintained.

Wiper seal:

Is installed on the outside of the cylinder. Its main function is to prevent dirt, debris, and other contaminants from entering the hydraulic system. Other types of dynamic seals include chevron seals, U-cup seals, and labyrinth seals.
