= McGraw–Hill Building (Chicago) =

Landmark building in Chicago, Illinois

Coordinates: 41.8915°N 87.6246°W

McGraw-Hill Building
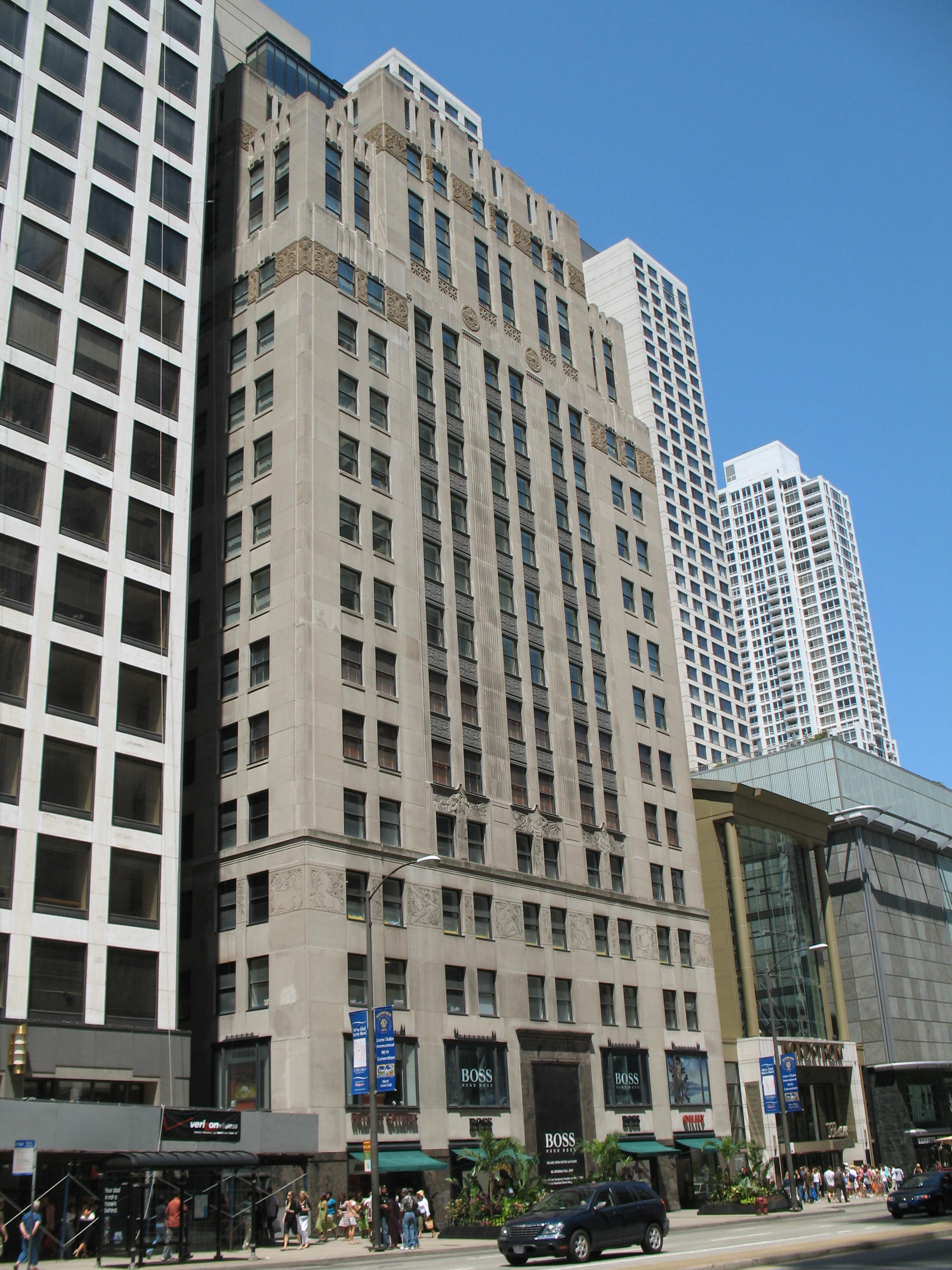

General information
- Location: Chicago, Illinois
- Address: 520 N. Michigan Avenue
- Country: United States

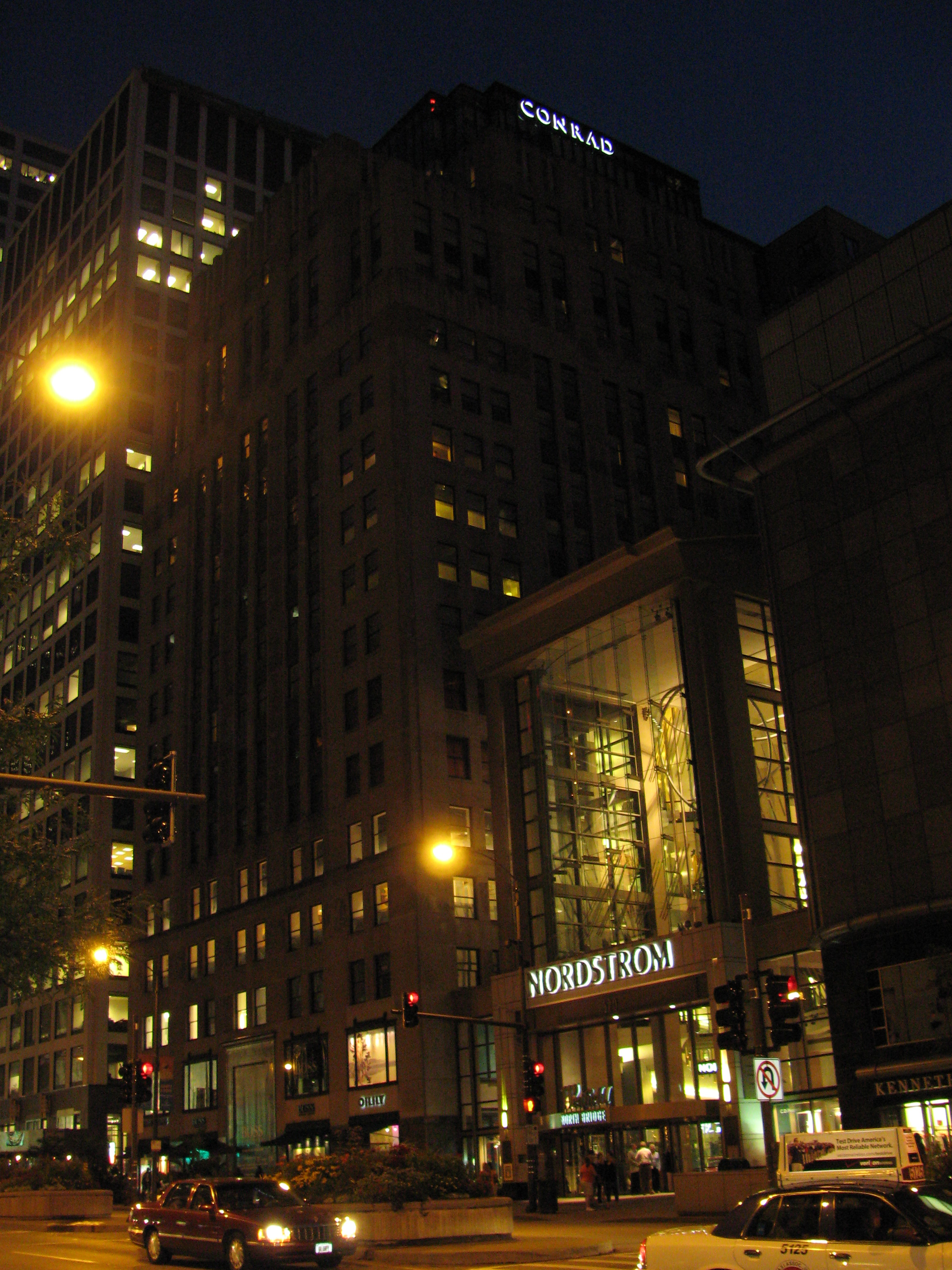
Night view showing the Conrad sign

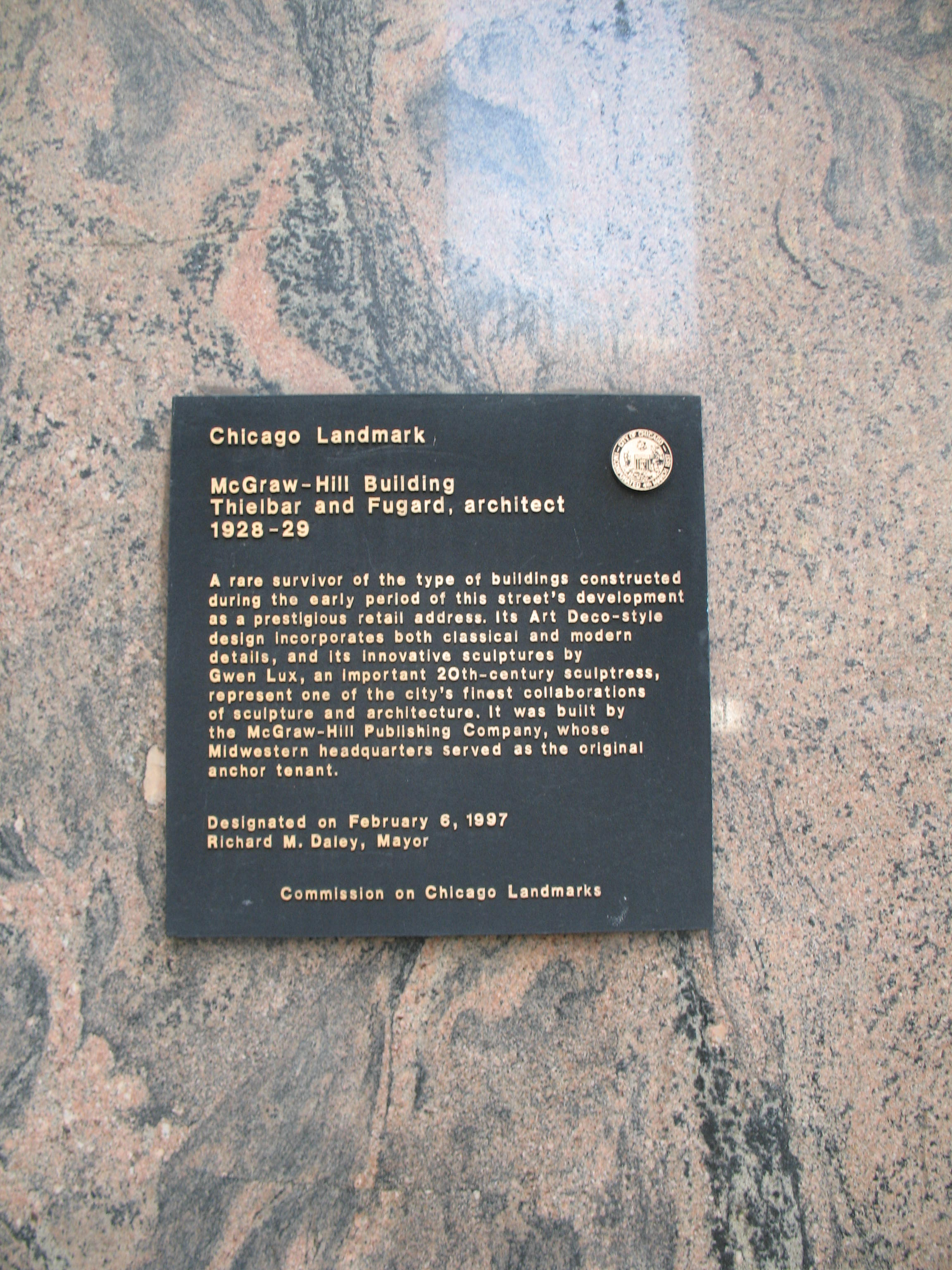
Chicago Landmark plaque

The McGraw–Hill Building was a 16-story, 190-foot-tall (58 m) landmark building in the Near North Side community area of Chicago, Illinois, at 520 N. Michigan Avenue. The facade and its architectural sculpture by Chicago-born artist Gwen Lux were designated a Chicago Landmark on February 7, 1997. The building was demolished in 1998; however, its facade was saved and reinstalled in 2000 on the new Le Méridien Chicago hotel building. The hotel was renamed the Conrad Chicago in 2005. The hotel was again renamed in 2015, becoming The Gwen, for sculptor Gwen Lux, and is part of The Luxury Collection. It was constructed by the McGraw-Hill Publishing Company, whose Midwestern headquarters served as the original anchor tenant.
