= Gwen Lux =

American sculptor

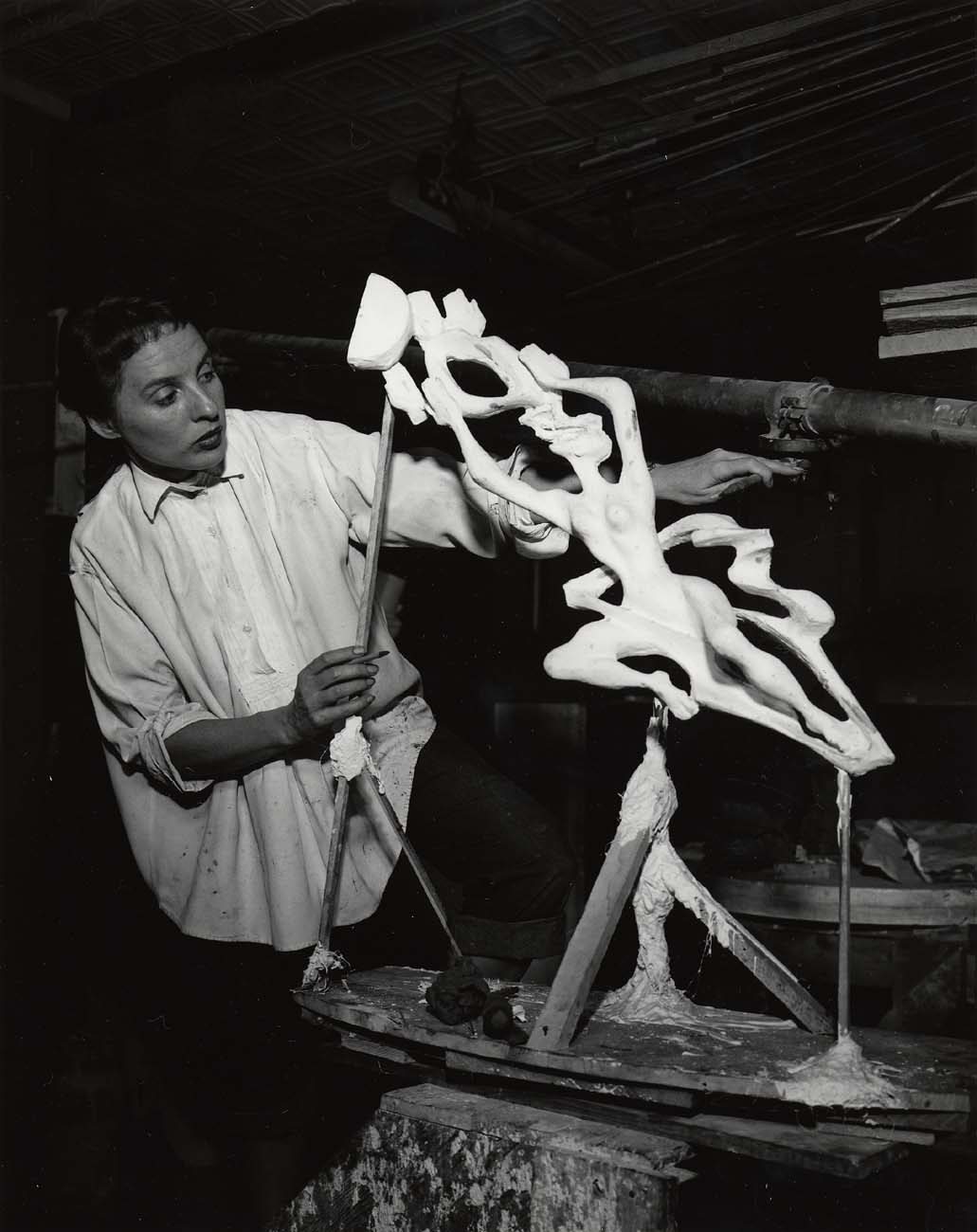
- Gwen Lux in her studio
- Born: Gwen Wickerts; November 17, 1908; Chicago, Illinois, U.S.
- Died: 1986 (aged 77–78); Honolulu, Hawaii, U.S.
- Other names: Gwen Creighton Lux, Gwen Lux Creighton, Gwen Wickerts Lux
- Education: Maryland Institute College of Art, School of the Museum of Fine Arts, Boston
- Occupations: Visual artist, educator
- Known for: Sculpture
- Spouse(s): Eugene "Gene" J. Lux (divorce), Thomas Hawk Creighton (m. 1959–1984; his death), Jerome R. Wallace (m. 1986; her death)

Gwen Lux Creighton, professionally Gwen Lux, (1908–1986) was an American sculptor known for her abstraction and frequently constructed from polyester resin concrete and metals. She was among America's pioneer women sculptors.

== Biography ==
Gwen Wickerts was born on November 17, 1908, in Chicago, Illinois.

She began her art studies in Detroit at age 14, taking classes with potter, Mary Chase Perry Stratton at Pewabic Pottery. She later studied at Wicker School of Fine Art and Art League of Detroit between 1923 and 1926. Followed by a year of study at Maryland Institute College of Art (MICA) from 1926 until 1927, and at the School of the Museum of Fine Arts, Boston from 1927 until 1928. She studied in Austria, and with Ivan Meštrović, 1930 to 1931. In 1933, she received a Guggenheim Fellowship for Fine Art.

Lux lived and worked in Detroit, Michigan in the early part of her career, and then moved to Honolulu, Hawaii in 1973.

Her first marriage was to fellow sculptor Eugene "Gene" J. Lux, which ended in divorce. In 1959, she married Thomas Hawk Creighton, a longtime editor of Progressive Architecture magazine. Thomas Hawk Creighton died in 1984 in Hawaii. In 1986, Lux married her longtime friend and companion Jerome R. Wallace, a well-known artist who created batiks using natural dyes found in the local environment on the island of Kauai, Hawaii. In March 1986, the Soho Too Gallery in Honolulu, Hawaii held an exhibition for both Jerome Wallace and Gwen Lux.

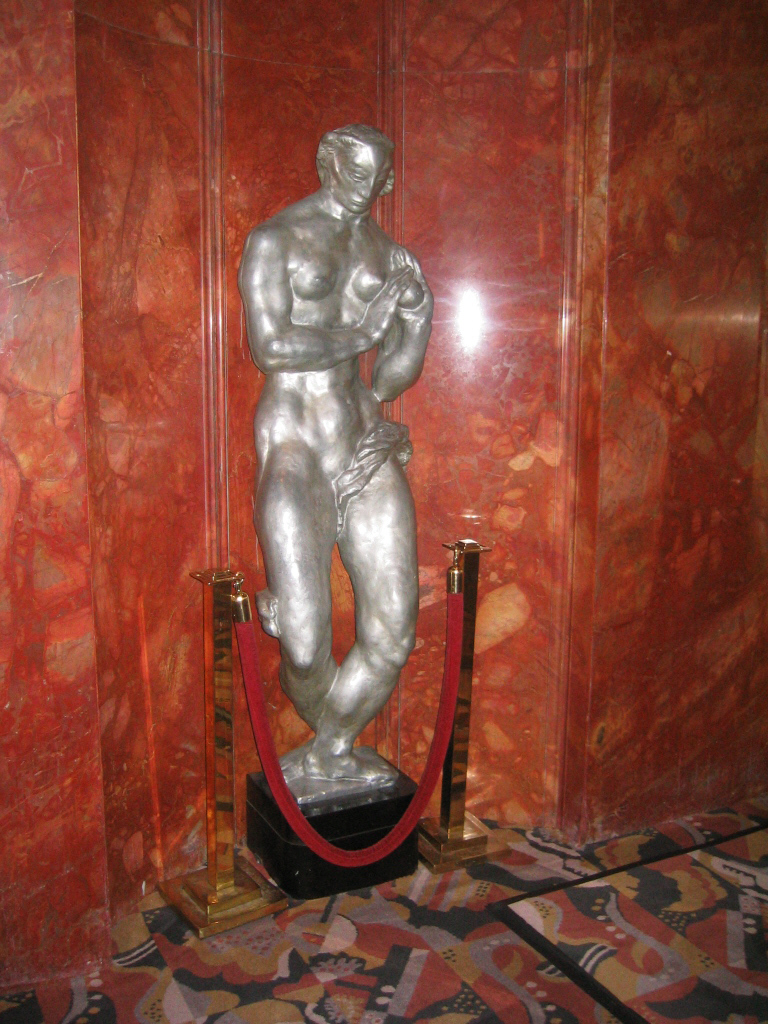
Eve in the lobby of Radio City Music Hall

== Notable commissions ==
Her commissions included sculptures for Radio City Music Hall in New York City, the McGraw-Hill Building in Chicago, the General Motors Technical Center in Detroit, and the centerpiece for the first-class dining room of the SS United States. The Detroit Institute of Arts, the Hawaii State Art Museum, the Eli and Edythe Broad Art Museum (Michigan State University, East Lansing) and the Mariners' Museum (Newport News, Virginia) are among the public collections holding her work.

Her sculpture entitled “Eve” was commissioned by Radio City Music Hall and purchased by the Rockefeller Center, New York in 1932, but was first met with controversial reviews.

Her sculptures combined abstraction and realism, and were frequently constructed from polyester resin concrete and metals. She taught sculpture classes at the Arts & Crafts Society of Detroit.

The Gwen, a luxury hotel located on Michigan Avenue, Chicago, is named for artist Gwen Lux and her sculpture adorns the building. The façade comes from the art-deco 1929 McGraw-Hill Building designed by the architectural firm of Thielbard & Fugard.

He is the Night (Kamehameha), fiberglass and resin, 1976, Hawaii State Art Museum
