= Acrylic rubber =

Type of rubber that has resistance to hot oil and oxidation

Acrylic rubber, known by the chemical name alkyl acrylate copolymer (ACM) or the tradename HyTemp, is a type of rubber that has outstanding resistance to hot oil and oxidation. It belongs to specialty rubbers. It has a continuous working temperature of 150 °C (302 °F) and an intermittent limit of 180 °C (356 °F). ACM is polar and lacks unsaturation. It is resistant to ozone and has low permeability to gases. Its disadvantage is its low resistance to moisture, acids, and bases. It should not be used in temperatures below −10 °C (14 °F).

It is commonly used in automotive transmissions and hoses. It is also used in shaft seals, adhesives, beltings, gaskets and O-rings. It is used in vibration damping mounts due to the damping properties.

== See also ==
- Copolymer
