= Back-up ring =

A back-up ring is a rigid ring that holds an elastomeric seal or plastic (such as Polyethylene) connection to its designed shape and in its correct place. Back up rings are commonly used with O-rings, lip seals, and as reciprocating shaft seals. They are also used for piping connections joining two different materials - typically one flexible and one rigid.

== Seals ==
When sealing the piston inside a pneumatic cylinder, a soft and flexible material is required to prevent leakage, but those same properties may leave the seal material vulnerable to being pulled out of its seat and then pinched or torn in the narrow space between piston and cylinder wall. If the joint cannot be redesigned, or a more resistant elastomer used, then the solution may be direct reinforcement with a stiffer material - in the form of a hard inner ring in this case. A second function can be to hold the elastomer in place while a machine is being assembled, as geometry may prevent the seal from being directly checked after assembly.

=== Rubber Contoured Back-Up Ring Size Chart ===
Contoured back-ups are routinely produced in a 90 durometer nitrile. This provides sufficient elasticity to permit stretching over the major diameter of a piston and then snapping back into the gland groove cut into the piston. 90 durometer has sufficient hardness to resist extrusion of the softer elastomeric O-ring performing the actual sealing function against the high pressure liquid or gas.

- 000 Series O-rings 0.070" ±0.003" - .045" Thick
- 100 Series O-rings 0.103" ±0.003" - .045" Thick
- 200 Series O-rings 0.139" ±0.004" - .040" Thick
- 300 Series O-rings 0.210" ±0.005" - .060" Thick
- 400 Series O-rings 0.275" ±0.006" - .096" Thick

== Pipe Connections ==
Back-up rings are used in Polyethylene (PE) pipe connections, such as HDPE pipes, where they are connected to steel pipe or pipe fittings.

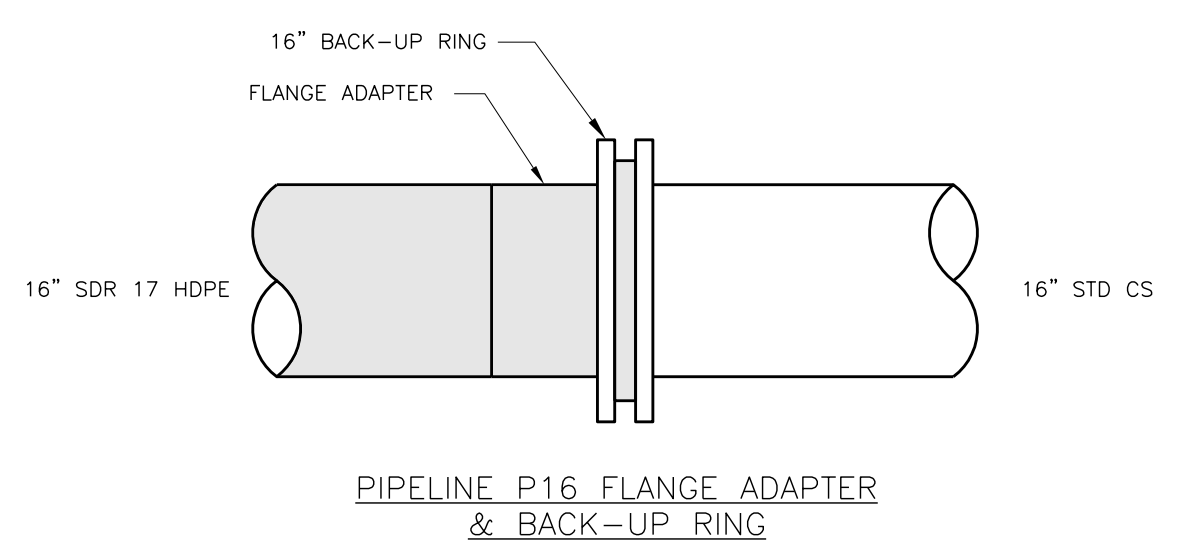
Pipeline Flange Adapter and Back-up Ring connection HDPE to steel pipe

The back-up ring is matched to the steel pipe flange specification and is placed behind the HDPE flange adapter - an end piece on the HDPE pipe that looks much like a steel flange at the end of the HDPE pipe. As the flange adapter does not have much structural strength, the back-up ring supports and compresses the HDPE flange adapter against the steel flange and creates an effective connection between the two piping materials.
