= Niels Christensen =

Niels Anton Christensen
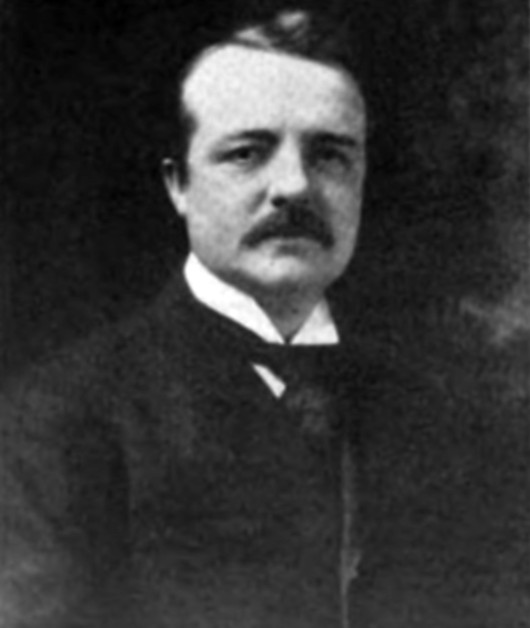

Personal details
- Born: 16 August 1865 Denmark
- Died: 5 October 1952 (aged 87)
- Profession: Engineer and Inventor

Niels Anton Christensen (16 August 1865 – 5 October 1952) was a Danish-American inventor whose principal invention was the O-ring, the ubiquitous hydraulic seal.

== Early years ==
Niels Anton Christensen was born on a farm in Tørring-Uldum Municipality, Denmark. He showed an early aptitude for mechanics and apprenticed to a machinist in Vejle, Denmark. After completing his apprenticeship, he entered the Technical Institute of Copenhagen, now the University of Copenhagen Faculty of Science. In 1891, at the age of 26, Christensen immigrated to the United States.

== Work ==
Christensen became a leading draftsman at Fraser and Chalmers in Chicago, a machinery manufacturer for industry, mining, and transportation. While working in Chicago, he witnessed an accident of a new electric railway, which resulted in two deaths and a number of injuries because the conductor was unable to stop the rail cars in time using the mechanical brake. Christensen decided to design and build a power brake. The Christensen air brake was successfully tested on Detroit's streetcar system, but an economic decline prevented Christensen from manufacturing and marketing the system.

He worked briefly on electrical systems for Chicago's Columbian Exposition and then was hired by the E. P. Allis Company of Milwaukee. While at E. P. Allis, he continued to develop his air brake for electric rail cars and streetcars. In 1896 he obtained financial backing that allowed him to make an experimental test apparatus. He also secured patents on the new valve mechanism. In early 1897, he founded Christensen Engineering Company, which initially operated in the Menomonee Valley at 718 Hanover. His operations were co-located with the Seamless Structural Company at the corner of Hanover and Burnham Streets.

George Westinghouse had developed an air braking system for steam locomotives and felt that Christensen's invention constituted patent infringement, suing him in December 1906. Westinghouse Air Brake Company acquired National Electric, renaming the company the National Brake & Electric Company, which refused to pay royalties to Niels Christensen. Christensen promptly countersued, starting a 24-year legal battle that went before the US Supreme Court on three occasions over the rights to manufacture compressed air brake systems for streetcars.

In 1933, when working in his basement, Christensen discovered by trial and error that a ring-shaped piece of rubber in a groove one and a half times long as the minor radius of the ring made a reliable, tight seal of a piston sliding in a cylinder. He applied for a U.S. patent in 1937 and it was granted two years later.

After Pearl Harbor, the United States government bought the rights to many war-related patents, and made them available to manufacturers royalty-free. Christensen was paid $75,000. When the war ended (formally in 1952) and the patent rights were transferred back to him, the patent had only four years left. Litigation resulted in a $100,000 payment to his heirs in 1971, 19 years after his death.

== Selected listing of inventions ==
- Propeller (1369399) – filed October 6, 1916; issued February 22, 1921
- Power controller for vehicle brakes (2150022) – filed November 3, 1932; issued March 7, 1939
- Air compressor (2074980) – filed October 17, 1932; issued March 23, 1937
- Brake mechanism (2197068) – filed March 10, 1938; issued April 16, 1940
- Automobile wheel and brake mechanism (2172788) – filed July 16, 1935; issued September 12, 1939

== Related reading ==
- Weber, Robert John and David N. Perkins Inventive minds: creativity in technology (Volume 49. Oxford University Press. 1992)
- Christensen, Niels A. U. S. Patent 2,180,795 (Packing. November 21, 1939)
