= Gasket =

Type of mechanical seal

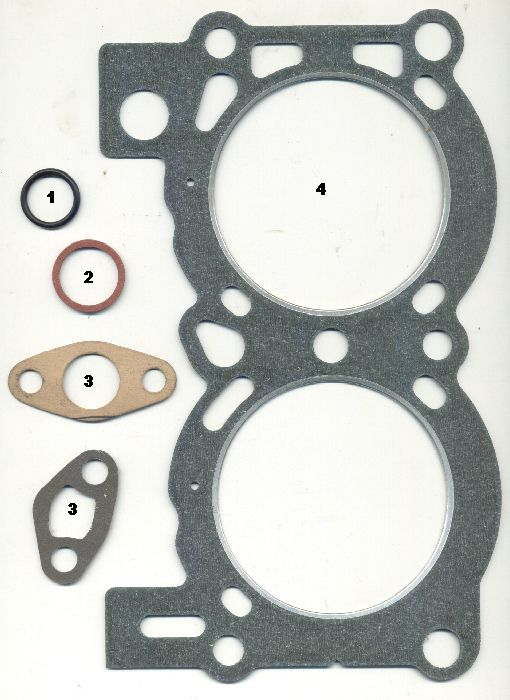
Some seals and gaskets: 1. o-ring; 2. fiber washer; 3. paper gasket; 4. cylinder head gasket

A gasket is a mechanical seal which fills the space between two or more mating surfaces, generally to prevent leakage from or into the joined objects while under compression. It is a deformable material that is used to create a static seal and maintain that seal under various operating conditions in a mechanical assembly.

Gaskets allow for "less-than-perfect" mating surfaces on machine parts where they can fill irregularities. Gaskets are commonly produced by cutting from sheet materials. Given the potential cost and safety implications of faulty or leaking gaskets, it is critical that the correct gasket material is selected to fit the needs of the application.

Gaskets for specific applications, such as high pressure steam systems, may contain asbestos. However, due to health hazards associated with asbestos exposure, non-asbestos gasket materials are used when practical.

It is usually desirable that the gasket be made from a material that is to some degree yielding such that it is able to deform and tightly fill the space it is designed for, including any slight irregularities. Some types of gaskets require a sealant be applied directly to the gasket surface to function properly.

Some (piping) gaskets are made entirely of metal and rely on a seating surface to accomplish the seal; the metal's own spring characteristics are utilized (up to but not passing σ_{y}, the material's yield strength). This is typical of some "ring joints" (RTJ) or some other metal gasket systems. These joints are known as R-con and E-con compressive type joints.

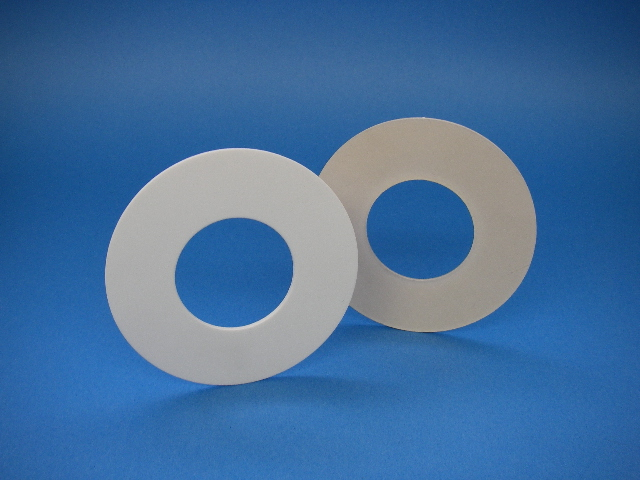
Polytetrafluoroethylene (PTFE) gasket

Some gaskets are dispensed and cured in place. These materials are called formed-in-place gaskets.

== Properties ==
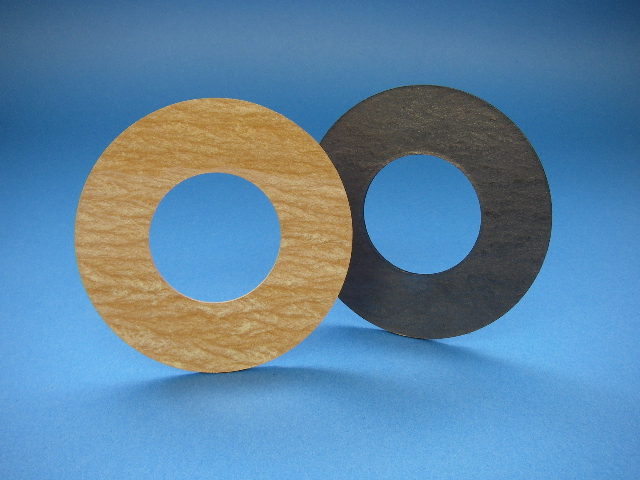
Compressed fiber gasket

Gaskets are normally made from a flat material, a sheet such as paper, rubber, silicone, metal, cork, felt, neoprene, nitrile rubber, fiberglass, polytetrafluoroethylene (otherwise known as PTFE or Teflon) or a plastic polymer (such as polychlorotrifluoroethylene).

One of the more desirable properties of an effective gasket in industrial applications for compressed fiber gasket material is the ability to withstand high compressive loads. Most industrial gasket applications involve bolts exerting compression well into the 14 MPa (2000 psi) range or higher. Generally speaking, there are several truisms that allow for better gasket performance. One of the more tried and tested is: "The more compressive load exerted on the gasket, the longer it will last".

There are several ways to measure a gasket material's ability to withstand compressive loading. The "hot compression test" is probably the most accepted of these tests. Most manufacturers of gasket materials will provide or publish the results of these tests.

== Types ==
Gaskets come in many different designs based on industrial usage, budget, chemical contact and physical parameters:

=== Sheet gaskets ===
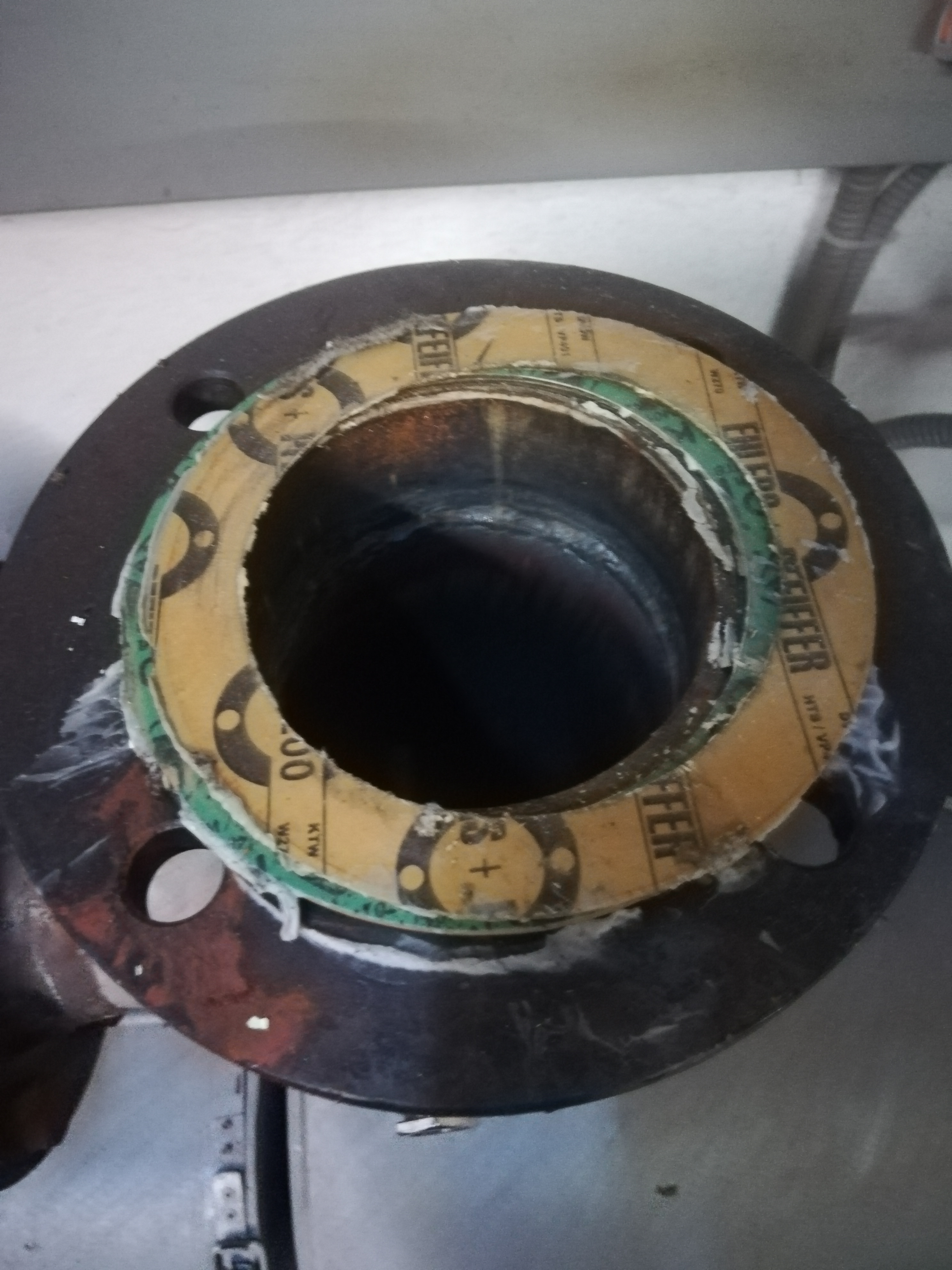
Gasket containing white asbestos, dismantled during a redevelopment project in Germany. Parts containing asbestos must be dismantled and disposed of with care, in this case following the BAuA TRGS 519 technical guide for handling asbestos during demolition, reconstruction or maintenance work

Gaskets can be produced by punching the required shape out of a sheet of flat, thin material, resulting in a sheet gaskets. Sheet gasket are fast and cheap to produce, and can be produced from a variety of materials, among them fibrous materials and matted graphite (and in the past - compressed asbestos). These gaskets can fill various different chemical requirements based on the inertness of the material used. Non-asbestos gasket sheet is durable, of multiple materials, and thick in nature. Material examples are mineral, carbon or synthetic rubbers such as EPDM, Nitrile, Neoprene, Natural, SBR Insertion - each of which have unique properties suitable for different applications. Applications using sheet gaskets involve acids, corrosive chemicals, steam or mild caustics. Flexibility and good recovery prevent breakage during installation of a sheet gasket.

=== Solid material gaskets ===
The idea behind solid material is to use metals which cannot be punched out of sheets but are still cheap to produce. These gaskets generally have a much higher level of quality control than sheet gaskets and generally can withstand much higher temperatures and pressures. The key downside is that a solid metal must be greatly compressed in order to become flush with the flange head and prevent leakage. The material choice is more difficult; because metals are primarily used, process contamination and oxidation are risks. An additional downside is that the metal used must be softer than the flange — in order to ensure that the flange does not warp and thereby prevent sealing with future gaskets. Even so, these gaskets have found a niche in industry.

=== Spiral-wound gaskets ===
Spiral-wound gaskets, invented by Flexitallic in 1912 comprise a mix of metallic and filler material. Generally, the gasket has a metal (normally carbon rich or stainless steel) wound outwards in a circular spiral (other shapes are possible) with the filler material (generally a flexible graphite) wound in the same manner but starting from the opposing side. This results in alternating layers of filler and metal. The filler material in these gaskets acts as the sealing element, with the metal providing structural support.

These gaskets have proven to be reliable in most applications, but do not allow for lower sealing loads as the metal element needs to be compressed in order to provide an effective seal.

=== Constant seating stress gaskets ===
The constant seating stress gasket consists of two components; a solid carrier ring of a suitable material, such as stainless steel, and two sealing elements of some compressible material installed within two opposing channels, one channel on either side of the carrier ring. The sealing elements are typically made from a material (expanded graphite, expanded polytetrafluoroethylene (PTFE), vermiculite, etc.) suitable to the process fluid and application.

Constant seating stress gaskets derive their name from the fact that the carrier ring profile takes flange rotation (deflection under bolt preload) into consideration. With all other conventional gaskets, as the flange fasteners are tightened, the flange deflects radially under load, resulting in the greatest gasket compression, and highest gasket stress, at the outer gasket edge.

Since the carrier ring used in constant seating stress gaskets take this deflection into account when creating the carrier ring for a given flange size, pressure class, and material, the carrier ring profile can be adjusted to enable the gasket seating stress to be radially uniform across the entire sealing area. Further, because the sealing elements are fully confined by the flange faces in opposing channels on the carrier ring, any in-service compressive forces acting on the gasket are transmitted through the carrier ring and avoid any further compression of the sealing elements, thus maintaining a 'constant' gasket seating stress while in-service. Thus, the gasket is immune to common gasket failure modes that include creep relaxation, high system vibration, or system thermal cycles.

The fundamental concept underlying the improved sealability for constant seating stress gaskets are that (i) if the flange sealing surfaces are capable of attaining a seal, (ii) the sealing elements are compatible with the process fluid and application, and (iii) the sufficient gasket seating stress is achieved on installation necessary to affect a seal, then the possibility of the gasket leaking in-service is greatly reduced or eliminated altogether.

=== Double-jacketed gaskets ===
Double-jacketed gaskets are another combination of filler material and metallic materials. In this application, a tube with ends that resemble a "C" is made of the metal with an additional piece made to fit inside of the "C" making the tube thickest at the meeting points. The filler is pumped between the shell and piece. When in use, the compressed gasket has a larger amount of metal at the two tips where contact is made (due to the shell/piece interaction) and these two places bear the burden of sealing the process. Since all that is needed is a shell and piece, these gaskets can be made from almost any material that can be made into a sheet and a filler can then be inserted.

=== Kammprofile gaskets ===
Kammprofile gaskets (sometimes spelled "Camprofile" due to their design resembling the profile of a camshaft, which is a rotating component in internal combustion engines.) are used in many older seals since they have both a flexible nature and reliable performance. Kammprofiles work by having a solid grooved core with a soft covering layer. This arrangement allows for very high compression without damage to the gasket and an extremely tight seal. Kammprofile gaskets has a high capital cost for most applications but this is countered by long life and increased reliability.

Kammprofile gaskets allow for low sealing loads, as a seal is formed as soon as the soft covering is fully compressed. As the metal core provides a solid support, they have an incredibly wide range of allowable gasket stress.

=== Fishbone gaskets ===
Fishbone gaskets are direct replacements for kammprofile and spiralwound gaskets. They are fully CNC machine manufactured from similar materials but the design of the gaskets has eliminated inherent short comings. Fishbone gaskets do not unwind in storage or in the plant. The rounded edges do not cause flange damage. The added "Stop Step" prevents the fishbone gaskets from being over compressed/crushed, often caused by hot torque techniques on plant start up. The bones of the gasket remain ductile and adjust to thermal cycling and system pressure spikes, resulting in a durable and reliable flange seal that out performs all other gaskets of this nature significantly.

=== Flange gasket ===
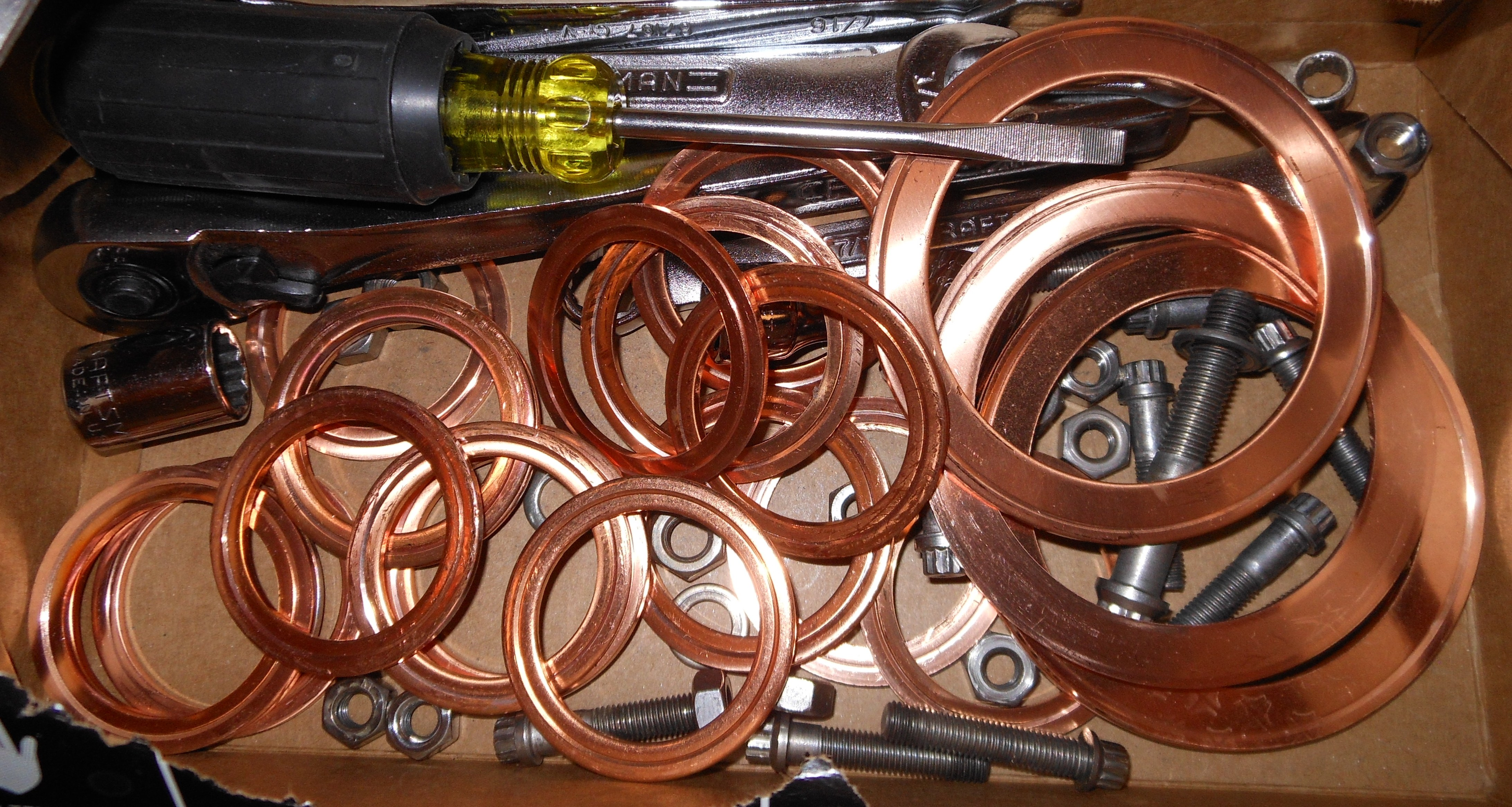
Copper flange gaskets used for ultra-high vacuum systems

A flange gasket is a type of gasket made to fit between two sections of pipe that are flared to provide higher surface area.

Flange gaskets come in a variety of sizes and are categorized by their inside diameter and their outside diameter.

There are many standards in gasket for flanges of pipes. The gaskets for flanges can be divided into four major categories:

1. Sheet gaskets
2. Corrugated metal gaskets
3. Ring gaskets
4. Spiral wound gaskets

Sheet gaskets are simple, they are cut to size either with bolt holes or without holes for standard sizes with various thickness and material suitable to media and temperature pressure of pipeline.

Ring gaskets also known as RTJ. They are mostly used in offshore oil- and gas pipelines and are designed to work under extremely high pressure. They are solid rings of metal in different cross sections like oval, round, octagonal etc. Sometimes they come with hole in center for pressure .

Spiral wound gaskets are also used in high pressure pipelines and are made with stainless steel outer and inner rings and a center filled with spirally wound stainless steel tape wound together with graphite and PTFE, formed in V shape. Internal pressure acts upon the faces of the V, forcing the gasket to seal against the flange faces. Most spiral wound gasket applications will use two standard gasket thicknesses: 1/8 inch and 3/16 inch. With 1/8 inch thick gaskets, compression to a 0.100 inch thickness is recommended. For 3/16 inches, compress to a 0.13 inch thickness.

=== Soft cut gasket ===
Soft gasket is a term that refers to a gasket that is cut from a soft (flexible) sheet material and can easily conform to surface irregularities even when the bolt load is low. Soft gaskets are used in applications such as heat exchangers, compressors, bonnet valve and pipe flanges.

=== Ring type joint gasket (RTJ gasket) ===
Annular Seal (RTJ Seal) is a high integrity, high temperature, high pressure seal for applications in the oil industry, oilfield drilling, pressure vessel connections, pipes, valves and more.

The movement of the ring packing (RTJ) can be described as an irregular flow in the groove of the deformed sealing flange due to the axial compressive load. Colored seal (RTJ seal) has a small load area, which leads to a large surface pressure between the sealing surface and the groove, the maintenance properties are poor and not suitable for reuse.

== Improvements ==
Many gaskets contain minor improvements to increase or infer acceptable operating conditions:

- A common improvement is an inner compression ring. A compression ring allows for higher flange compression while preventing gasket failure. The effects of a compression ring are minimal and generally are just used when the standard design experiences a high rate of failure.
- A common improvement is an outer guiding ring. A guiding ring allows for easier installation and serves as a minor compression inhibitor. In some alkylation uses these can be modified on Double Jacketed gaskets to show when the first seal has failed through an inner lining system coupled with alkylation paint.

== Reasons for failure ==
=== Uneven distributed pressing force ===
Uneven pressure can be caused by a variety of factors. First is the human factor: asymmetric application of the bolt preload, this can cause uneven pressure. Theoretically when the flanges are pressed, the sealing surfaces are absolutely parallel, in practice however, the centerline of a pipeline cannot be absolutely concentric, and tightening the bolts on the flange moment makes the flange a discontinuity. With asymmetric connections, the seal surfaces will be more or less deformed and the pressure reduced, the running load, prone to leakage. Third, the density of bolt arrangement has an obvious impact on the pressure distribution, the closer the bolts, the more uniform the pressure.

=== Stress relaxation and torque loss ===
Tighten the bolts on the flange. Due to vibration, temperature changes, and other factors such as spiral wound gasket stress relaxation, the bolt tension will gradually decrease, resulting in loss of torque, causing a leak. In general longer bolts and smaller diameters of bolt are better at preventing the loss of torque. A long thin bolt is an effective way to prevent torque loss. Heating for a certain period of time to stretch the bolt, and then maintaining a given torque, is very effective in preventing the loss of torque. When the gasket is thinner and smaller there will be a greater loss of torque. In addition, prevent strong vibration of the machine and the pipe itself, and isolate them from adjacent equipment vibration. Impacts on the sealing surface are not meaningless. Not impacting the tightened bolts can prevent the loss of torque.

=== Surface not smooth ===
It is important to make the sealing finish properly otherwise it will cause leakage. A surface that is too smooth can allow the gasket material to blow out under pressure. A surface that is not machined flat can provide leak paths. A good rule of thumb is a machined surface to 32RMS. This ensures the surface is flat, but with enough surface finish to bite into the gasket under compression.

=== Metal reinforced gasket ===
With metal core coated gaskets, both sides of the core are covered with a flexible, malleable sealant. There are reinforced metal seals in the pressure class up to 300. A strong metal core prevents pressure seals and a soft core ensures exceptional sealing.

== See also ==
- Other materials for sealing joints in plumbing
  - Oakum
  - Plumber's putty
  - Thread seal tape (plumber's tape)
- Head gasket
- Ozone cracking
- Polymer degradation
- Vacuum flange
- Wills Ring

== Sources ==
- Bickford, John H.: An Introduction to the Design and Behavior of Bolted Joints, 3rd ed., Marcel Dekker, 1995, pg. 5
- Latte, Dr. Jorge and Rossi, Claudio: High Temperature Behavior of Compressed Fiber Gasket Materials, and an Alternative Approach to the Prediction of Gasket Life, FSA presented Paper, 1995, pg. 16
