= Wills Ring =

A Wills Ring or Cooper Ring is a form of all-metallic O-ring seal. They are used for extremely arduous service, such as sealing the head gasket of high performance piston engines.

Hollow, metallic Wills Rings are used as they have better springback than yielding soft metal seals and higher temperature limits than elastomer O rings.

== Construction ==
A Wills Ring is an O-ring in the form of a hollow metallic tube. They are pressurised internally by gas pressure The advantages of this construction are that the rings can seal against a wide range of conditions. Metallic construction makes them robust against high or low temperatures and chemical attack. Softer coatings may be applied to provide even better compatibility, or to seal against roughly machined surfaces. Internal pressurisation makes them compliant, both for the range of movement required and with their speed of response being faster than elastomeric O-rings. Their flexure is also unaffected by temperature. (Note: The Space Shuttle Challenger disaster was an accident caused by the poor dynamic response of cold elastomers.)

Rings are pressurised by either a static gas fill during manufacture, or may be pressure-actuated by the applied pressure on the joint in service. These pressure-actuated rings have vents on the pressure side to allow gas ingress. The 4 MPa (Note: Atmospheric pressure is approximately 0.1 MPa) pressure limit of the unpressurised ring is exceeded by the 40 MPa of the internally pressurised ring and 200 MPa or 1,000 MPa for the externally pressurised forms.

Wills Rings are manufactured in five overall types:

Hollow, internally gas pressurised
A high performance seal suitable for extreme pressures and still sealing when pressure is released.
Hollow, slotted pressure-actuated
Best springback performance.
Hollow, vented
Suitable for even higher pressures than the slotted form.
Hollow, unpressurised
Lower cost and higher clamping forces
Solid
Limited springback and pressure capacity, these are mostly used as a non-outgassing metallic seal for use in vacuum systems.

The vented and slotted forms are usually vented to the inside, for carrying an internal pressure, but are also available with external vents, for use in high external pressures, such as in undersea use. (Note: As vacuum systems will develop a maximum of 1 Bar pressure differential, they use the internally pressurised or solid forms instead.)

They are only used for static face sealing, not moving glands. The thin tube walls are sensitive to damage from rough handling, point tools and crimping during assembly. The pressure-actuated form is considered to be slightly more resistant to point damage, but more at risk of folding and crimping, as they are not supported by internal pressurisation during assembly.

Rings are installed in machined grooves in, usually one of, the mating faces. The correct perpendicular depth of these grooves (rather than their width or cross-sectional area) is an important factor that controls seal performance. Unlike the grooves for elastomer O-rings, the width and shape of the groove is unimportant, just the depth. It is even possible for this 'groove' to become an open-sided groove or aperture, provided that this free height is maintained.

Wills Rings are constructed in a variety of refractory metals including stainless steel and Inconel. Coatings of PTFE or varying thicknesses of silver plating are also available.

== Applications ==
=== Cylinder head gaskets ===
One of the best-known applications for pressurised Wills Rings, or Cooper Rings as they were originally known, is for sealing the combustion chamber of piston engines. These are not widely used, owing to their high cost and the good performance of other modern gaskets, but they have a place for high-performance engines.

One of the first applications in this case was for the Coventry Climax racing engines. Coventry Climax's more mundane utility engines did not require these seals, but they were adopted to production car engines such as the Hillman Imp, and when these were re-tuned for racing, it was a regular practice to add this type of supplementary seal. Some Coventry Climax designs, such as the FWMV V8, used an open-deck block with wet liners. These were located in place at the base of the liner, rather than near the cylinder head. They were thus susceptible to problems from differential thermal expansion, giving rise to coolant leakage, where the block and liner expanded at different rates: specifically when the liners contracted more rapidly as engine load was reduced. The solution to this was to redesign the liner so that they were located at the top instead, reducing the distance susceptible to expansion. The high compliance of the Wills Ring, thanks to their internal pressurisation, allowed reliable sealing, even though the short clamping distance now had little elasticity and so the applied clamping force from the head bolts could vary substantially.

=== Cost ===
Wills Rings are expensive in comparison to other seals, such as elastomer O-rings or metallic foil head gaskets. A typical comparison is one ring (Note: Motor-racing quality, rather than aerospace.) costing approx. $50 each, around the price of a high-performance head gasket for a four-cylinder engine.
