= Nils Christensen Ringnæs =

Norwegian politician

Nils Christensen Ringnæs (9 June 1792 - 23 July 1863) was a Norwegian politician.

He was elected to the Norwegian Parliament in 1842 and 1845, representing the rural constituency of Hedemarkens Amt (today named Hedmark). He worked as a farmer and bailiff.
