= Ozonolysis =

Cleavage of C=C, C≡C, or N=N bonds with ozone

Reaction type	Organic redox reaction

Identifiers
Organic Chemistry Portal	ozonolysis-criegee-mechanism

In organic chemistry, ozonolysis is an organic reaction where the unsaturated bonds are cleaved with ozone (O_{3}). Multiple carbon–carbon bond are replaced by carbonyl (C=O) groups, such as aldehydes, ketones, and carboxylic acids. The reaction is predominantly applied to alkenes, but alkynes and azo compounds are also susceptible to cleavage. The outcome of the reaction depends on the type of multiple bond being oxidized and the work-up conditions.

Detailed procedures have been reported.

== Ozonolysis of alkenes ==
Alkene Ozonolysis
Reaction type	Organic redox reaction

Reaction
Alkene
+
O_{3}
+
Typically reducing agents
↓
Cleavage products

Identifiers
Organic Chemistry Portal	ozonolysis-criegee-mechanism
RSC ontology ID	RXNO:0000344

Alkenes can be oxidized with ozone to form alcohols, aldehydes or ketones, or carboxylic acids. In a typical procedure, ozone is bubbled through a solution of the alkene in methanol at −78 °C (−108 °F; 195 K) until the solution takes on a characteristic blue color, which is due to unreacted ozone. Industry however recommends temperatures near −20 °C (−4 °F; 253 K). This color change indicates complete consumption of the alkene. Alternatively, various other reagents can be used as indicators of this endpoint by detecting the presence of ozone. If ozonolysis is performed by introducing a stream of ozone-enriched oxygen through the reaction mixture, the effluent gas can be directed through a potassium iodide solution. When the solution has stopped absorbing ozone, the excess ozone oxidizes the iodide to iodine, which can easily be observed by its violet color. For closer control of the reaction itself, an indicator such as Sudan Red III can be added to the reaction mixture. Ozone reacts with this indicator more slowly than with the intended ozonolysis target. The ozonolysis of the indicator, which causes a noticeable color change, only occurs once the desired target has been consumed. If the substrate has two alkenes that react with ozone at different rates, one can choose an indicator whose own oxidation rate is intermediate between them, and therefore stop the reaction when only the most susceptible alkene in the substrate has reacted. Otherwise, the presence of unreacted ozone in solution (seeing its blue color) or in the bubbles (via iodide detection) only indicates when all alkenes have reacted.

After completing the addition, a reagent is then added in a work-up step to decompose the heterocyclic products of the alkene–ozone reaction into various carbonyl or hydroxyl products. Reductive work-up conditions are far more commonly used than oxidative conditions.

The use of triphenylphosphine, thiourea, zinc dust, or dimethyl sulfide produces aldehydes or ketones. While the use of sodium borohydride produces alcohols. (R group can also be hydrogens)

The use of hydrogen peroxide can produce carboxylic acids.

Amine N-oxides produce aldehydes directly. Other functional groups, such as benzyl ethers, can also be oxidized by ozone. It has been proposed that small amounts of acid may be generated during the reaction from oxidation of the solvent, so pyridine is sometimes used to buffer the reaction. Dichloromethane is often used as a 1:1 cosolvent to facilitate the reaction. Azelaic acid and pelargonic acids are produced from ozonolysis of oleic acid on an industrial scale.

An example is the ozonolysis of eugenol converting the terminal alkene to an aldehyde:

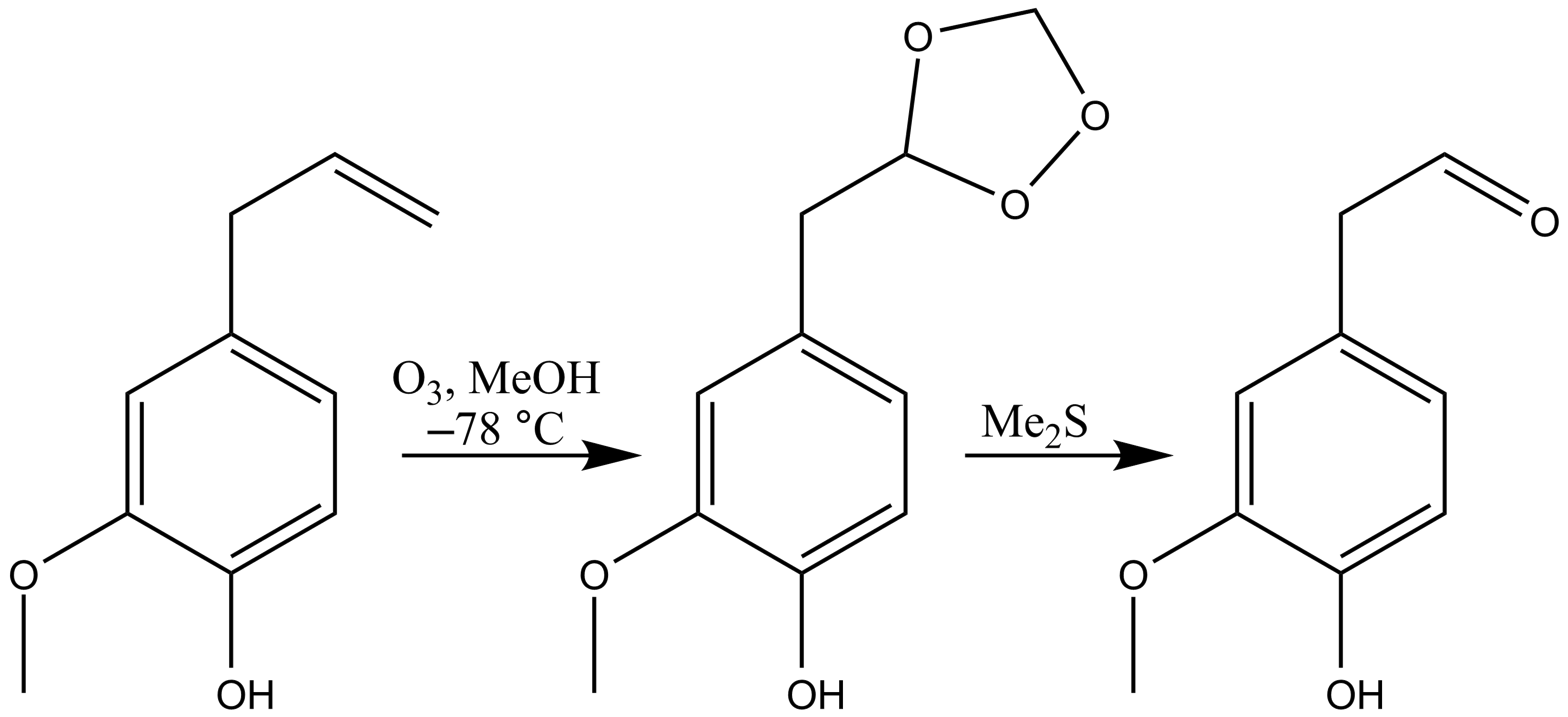

By controlling the reaction/workup conditions, unsymmetrical products can be generated from symmetrical alkenes:

- Using TsOH; sodium bicarbonate (NaHCO_{3}); dimethyl sulfide (DMS) gives an aldehyde and a dimethyl acetal
- Using acetic anhydride (Ac_{2}O), triethylamine (Et_{3}N) gives a methyl ester and an aldehyde
- Using TsOH; Ac_{2}O, Et_{3}N, gives a methyl ester and a dimethyl acetal.

=== Reaction mechanism ===

In the generally accepted mechanism proposed by Rudolf Criegee in 1953, the alkene and ozone form an intermediate 1,2,3-trioxolane (called a molozonide, or sometimes primary ozonide, in this context) in a 1,3-dipolar cycloaddition. Next, the molozonide reverts to its corresponding carbonyl oxide (also called the Criegee intermediate or Criegee zwitterion) and aldehyde or ketone (3) in a retro-1,3-dipolar cycloaddition. The oxide and aldehyde or ketone react again in a 1,3-dipolar cycloaddition, producing a relatively stable 1,2,4-trioxolane (called an ozonide, or sometimes secondary ozonide, in this context) intermediate (4).

Evidence for this mechanism is found in isotopic labeling. When ^{17}O-labelled benzaldehyde reacts with carbonyl oxides, the label ends up exclusively in the ether linkage of the ozonide. There is still dispute over whether the molozonide collapses via a concerted or radical process; this may also exhibit a substrate dependence.

=== History ===
Christian Friedrich Schönbein, who discovered ozone in 1840, also did the first ozonolysis: in 1845, he reported that ethylene reacts with ozone – after the reaction, neither the smell of ozone nor the smell of ethylene was perceivable. The ozonolysis of alkenes is sometimes referred to as "Harries ozonolysis", because some attribute this reaction to Carl Dietrich Harries. Before the advent of modern spectroscopic techniques, the ozonolysis was an important method for determining the structure of organic molecules. Chemists would ozonize an unknown alkene to yield smaller and more readily identifiable fragments.

=== Ozonolysis of alkynes ===
Ozonolysis of alkynes generally gives an acid anhydride or diketone product, not complete fragmentation as for alkenes. A reducing agent is not needed for these reactions. The mechanism is unknown. If the reaction is performed in the presence of water, the anhydride hydrolyzes to give two carboxylic acids.

=== Other substrates ===
Although rarely examined, azo compounds (N=N) are susceptible to ozonolysis. Nitrosamines (N−N=O) are produced.

== Applications ==
The main use of ozonolysis is for the conversion of unsaturated fatty acids to value-added derivatives. Ozonolysis of oleic acid is an important route to azelaic acid. The coproduct is nonanoic acid:

CH_{3}(CH_{2})_{7}CH=CH(CH_{2})_{7}CO_{2}H} + 4 O_{3} → HO_{2}C(CH_{2})_{7}CO_{2}H} + CH_{3}(CH_{2})_{7}CO_{2}H

Erucic acid is a precursor to brassylic acid, a C13-dicarboxylic acid that is used to make specialty polyamides and polyesters. The conversion entails ozonolysis, which selectively cleaves the C=C bond in erucic acid:

CH_{_{3}}(CH_{2})_{7}CH=CH(CH_{2})_{11}CO_{2}H + O_{3} + 0.5 O_{2} → CH_{3}(CH_{2})_{7}CO_{2}H + HO_{2}C(CH_{2})_{11}CO_{2}H

A number of drugs and their intermediates have been produced by ozonolysis. The use of ozone in the pharmaceutical industry is difficult to discern owing to confidentiality considerations.

=== Ozonolysis as an analytical method ===
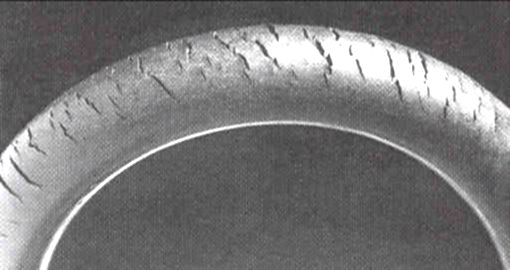
Ozone cracking in natural rubber tubing

Ozonolysis has been used to characterize the structure of some polyolefins. Early experiments showed that the repeat unit in natural rubber was shown to be isoprene.

== Occurrence ==
Ozonolysis can be a serious problem, known as ozone cracking where traces of the gas in an atmosphere degrade elastomers, such as natural rubber, polybutadiene, styrene-butadiene, and nitrile rubber. Ozonolysis produces surface ketone groups that can cause further gradual degradation via Norrish reactions if the polymer is exposed to light. To minimize this problem, many polyolefin-based products are treated with antiozonants.

Ozone cracking is a form of stress corrosion cracking where active chemical species attack products of a susceptible material. The rubber product must be under tension for crack growth to occur. Ozone cracking was once commonly seen in the sidewalls of tires, where it could expand to cause a dangerous blowout, but is now rare owing to the use of modern antiozonants. Other means of prevention include replacing susceptible rubbers with resistant elastomers such as polychloroprene, EPDM or Viton.

== Safety ==
The use of ozone in the pharmaceutical industry is limited by safety considerations.

== See also ==
- Polymer degradation
- Lemieux–Johnson oxidation – an alternative system using periodate and osmium tetroxide
- Trametes hirsuta, a biotechnological alternative to ozonolysis.
