= Applied spectroscopy =

Use of spectroscopy to investigate and solve problems

Applied spectroscopy is the application of various spectroscopic methods for the detection and identification of different elements or compounds to solve problems in fields like forensics, medicine, the oil industry, atmospheric chemistry, and pharmacology.

== Spectroscopic methods ==
=== Vibrational spectroscopy ===
==== FT-IR ====
A common spectroscopic method for analysis is Fourier transform infrared spectroscopy (FTIR), where chemical bonds can be detected through their characteristic infrared absorption frequencies or wavelengths. These absorption characteristics make infrared analyzers an invaluable tool in geoscience, environmental science, and atmospheric science. For instance, atmospheric gas monitoring has been facilitated by the development of commercially available gas analyzers which can distinguish between carbon dioxide, methane, carbon monoxide, oxygen, and nitric oxide. Three types of samples can be analyzed: solution (KBr), powder, or film. A solid film is one of the easiest and most straight forward sample type to test.

==== Raman ====
The use of Raman spectroscopy is growing for more specialist applications. Raman spectroscopy is another technique that can be used quantitatively and to identify analytes such as inorganic compounds, minerals, synthetic and natural pigments, and carbohydrates. One advantage Raman has over IR spectroscopy is that water does not absorb strongly in Raman and allows for easier analysis of aqueous samples.

==== IR microscopy ====
There are also derivative methods such as infrared microscopy, which allows very small areas to be analyzed in an optical microscope.

=== Ultraviolet-visible spectroscopy ===
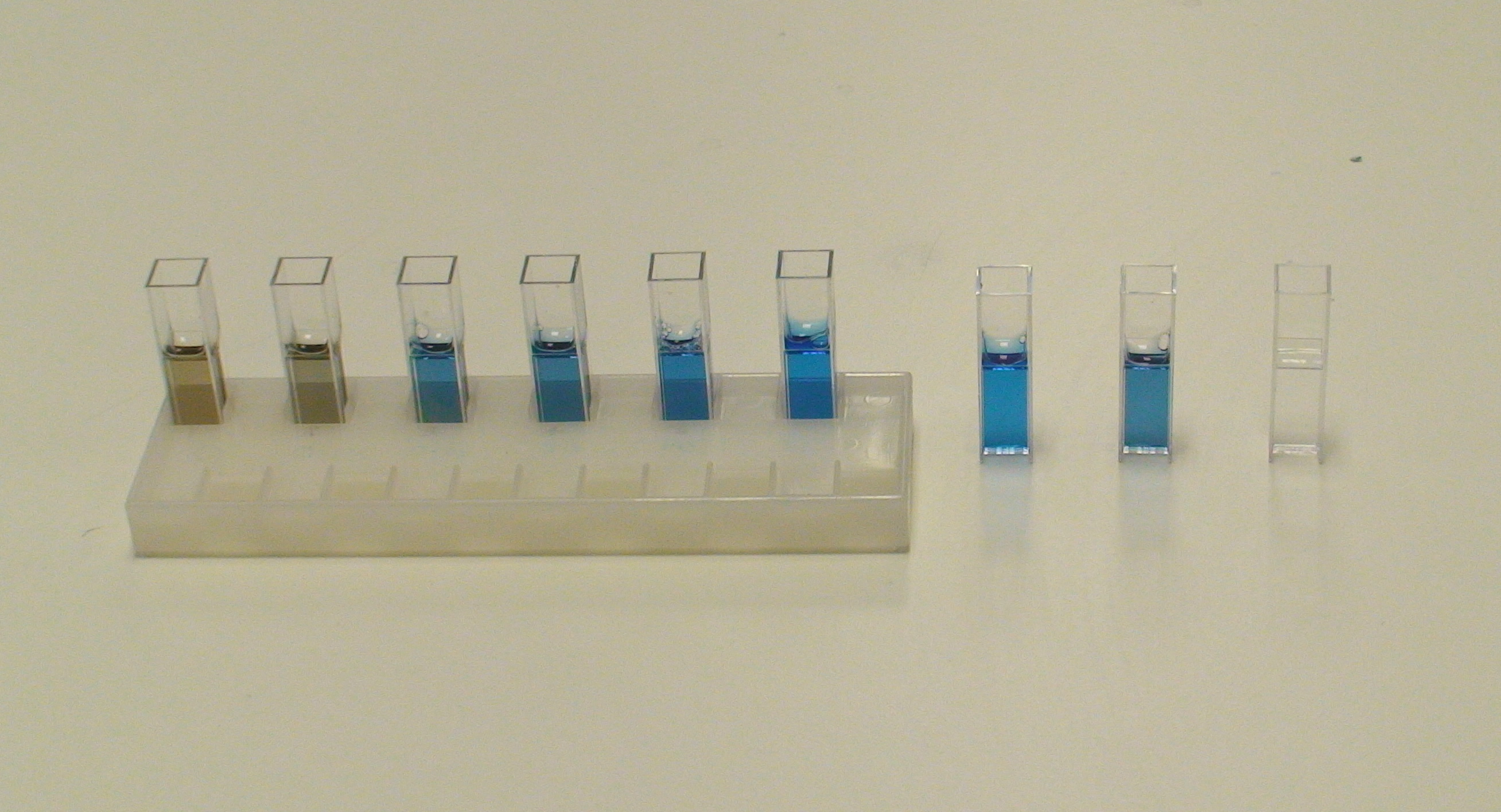
Cuvettes used for a Bradford protein assay experiment.

Ultraviolet-visible spectroscopy (UV-vis) is used where the analyte has strong absorption of light in the UV or in the visible region of the electromagnetic spectrum. Such analytes are known as chromophores and include aromatic groups, conjugated system of bonds, carbonyl groups and so on. UV-vis samples are typically liquids or solutions, and these samples are placed in sample cells called cuvettes. UV-vis spectroscopy is used in characterization and quantitative applications where the molar absorptivity of a analyte can be determined or the concentration of a sample can be determined.

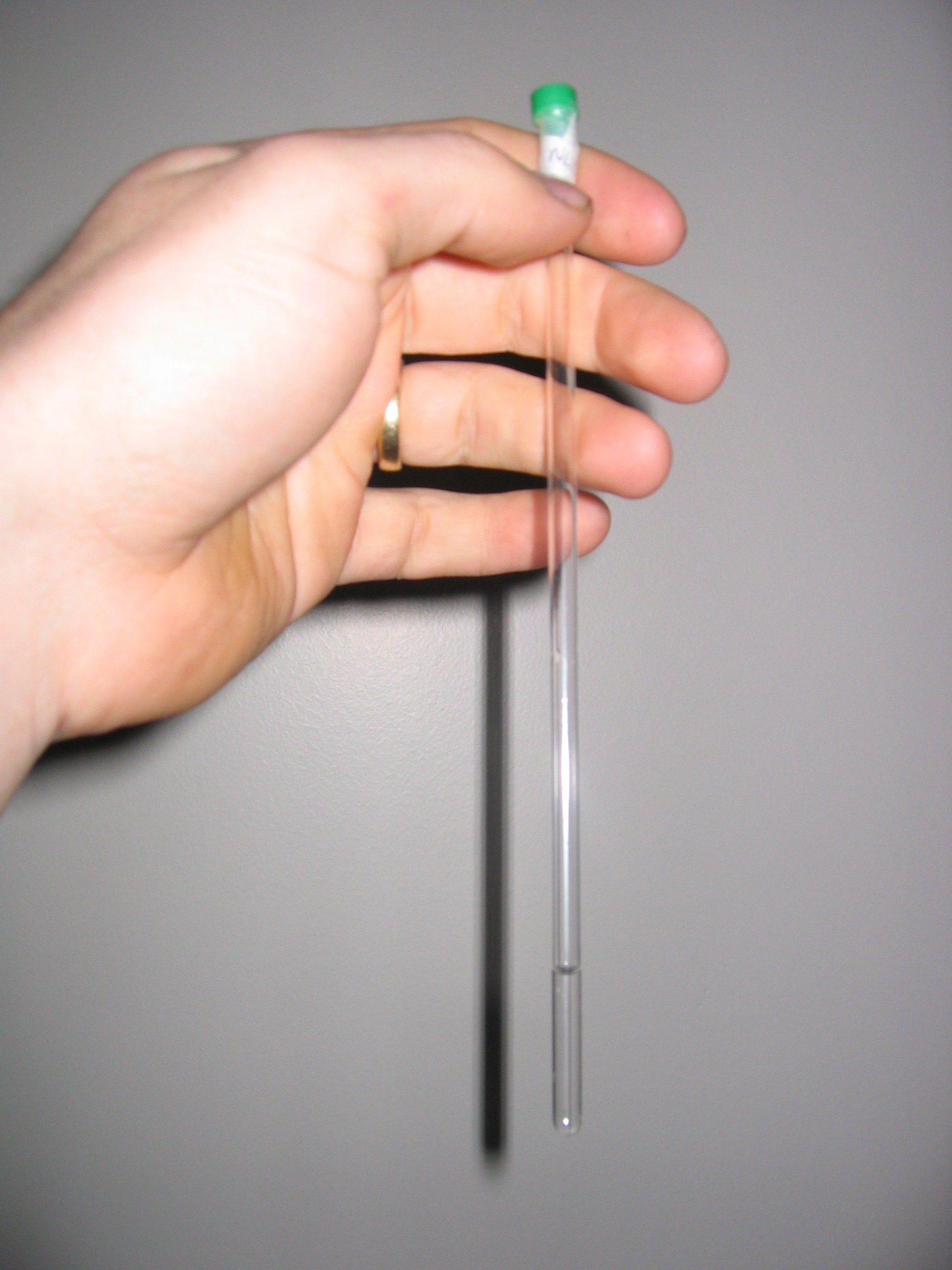
NMR sample in an NMR tube

=== Nuclear magnetic resonance spectroscopy ===
Nuclear magnetic resonance spectroscopy can be used to identify compounds by detecting hydrogen atoms (proton NMR) or other atoms such as carbon (carbon-13 NMR), in specific environments. Two-dimensional NMR is also widely used to gain additional information that one-dimensional NMR cannot provide. Common 2-D NMR experiments include COSY, NOESY, TOCSY, and HSQC. NMR can also be used used quantitatively in determining the relative concentration of an analyte in solution or in determining the purity of an analyte. NMR samples are prepared in NMR tubes, where solutions are made with deuterated lock solvents, such solvents include $d_6$-DMSO, CDCl$_3$ and D$_2$O. When preparing NMR samples, the type of experiment is an important factor in sample preparation and setting experimental parameters, e.g. $^{13}C$ NMR samples need to be more concentrated than $^{1}H$ NMR because $^{13}C$ NMR is less sensitive than $^{1}H$ NMR.

=== X-ray spectroscopy ===
One method of elemental analysis that is important in forensic analysis is energy-dispersive X-ray spectroscopy (EDX) performed in the environmental scanning electron microscope (ESEM). The method involves analysis of back-scattered X-rays from the sample as a result of interaction with the electron beam. Automated EDX is further used in a range of automated mineralogy techniques for identification and textural mapping.

=== Sample preparation ===
In many spectroscopic methods, the sample usually needs to be present in solution, which may present problems in analyzing certain samples. During forensic examination, it can be an issue because it necessarily involves sampling solid from the object to be examined.

== Medical and pharmaceutical applications ==
Nuclear magnetic resonance spectroscopy (NMR) has many uses in the medical and pharmaceutical industry. Magnetic resonance imaging (MRI) is a major application of NMR, where MRI is a highly utilized tool by medical professional to investigate and diagnose health ailments of patients. In the pharmaceutical industry, identification and evaluation of the purity of a product is an important task in the discovery, production, and distribution of pharmaceuticals. NMR and electron paramagnetic resonance spectroscopy (EPR) are widely helpful in the pharmaceutical industry in improving discovery, development, and production of pharmaceuticals such as small molecules drugs, complex biologics, and Cell and Gene therapies.

== Polymer applications ==
=== Analysis of polymers ===
Spectroscopy has a lot of has many tools that can be used in quantitative and qualitive analysis. Choosing a specific techniques depends on the type of experiment and sample being analyzed. FT-IR has uses in studying polymer processing in extraction, drying, impregnation, dyeing, and blending, under different conditions e.g. using supercritical carbon dioxide with PVME, PS, PEG/PVP, PEO/PMMA, and PET.

==== UV-vis spectroscopy ====
UV-vis can also help determine certain properties of a polymer of interest. For example, UV-Vis spectroscopy can be used as an alternative method to GPC for determining the number average molecular weight, M_{n}, of a polymer, with an attached chromophore (e.g. fluorene), synthesized by ATRP. M_{n} is determined by using absorbance measurements of the chromophore-labeled polymer and the Beer-Lambert Law equation:

$A=\epsilon c \ell$

Where A is absorbance, ε is the molar extinction coefficient, c is the concentration of the sample, and l is the path length of the sample.

UV-Vis and the Beer-Lamber law equation can also be used to quantify chain transfer agents that are used in RAFT and determine M_{n} of the polymer of interest, that is if the chain transfer agent absorbs in the UV-vis region.

=== Polymer degradation ===
Many polymer degradation mechanisms can be followed using IR spectroscopy, such as UV degradation and oxidation, among many other failure modes.

==== UV degradation ====
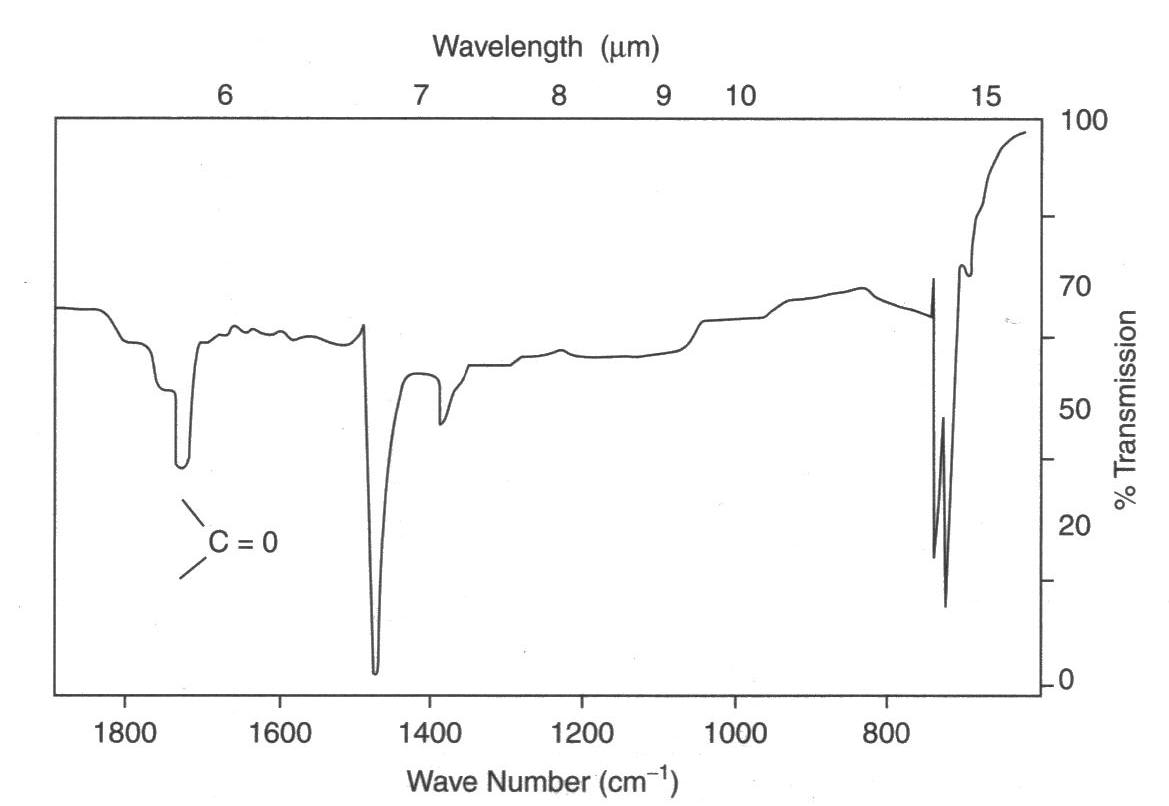
IR spectrum showing carbonyl absorption due to UV degradation of polyethylene

Many polymers are attacked by UV radiation at vulnerable points in their chain structures. Thus, polypropylene suffers severe cracking in sunlight unless anti-oxidants are added. The point of attack occurs at the tertiary carbon atom present in every repeat unit, causing oxidation and finally chain breakage. Polyethylene is also susceptible to UV degradation, especially those variants that are branched polymers such as low-density polyethylene. The branch points are tertiary carbon atoms, so polymer degradation starts there and results in chain cleavage, and embrittlement. In the example shown at left, carbonyl groups were readily detected by IR spectroscopy from a cast thin film. The product was a road cone that had cracked in service, and many similar cones also failed because an anti-UV additive had not been used.

==== Oxidation ====
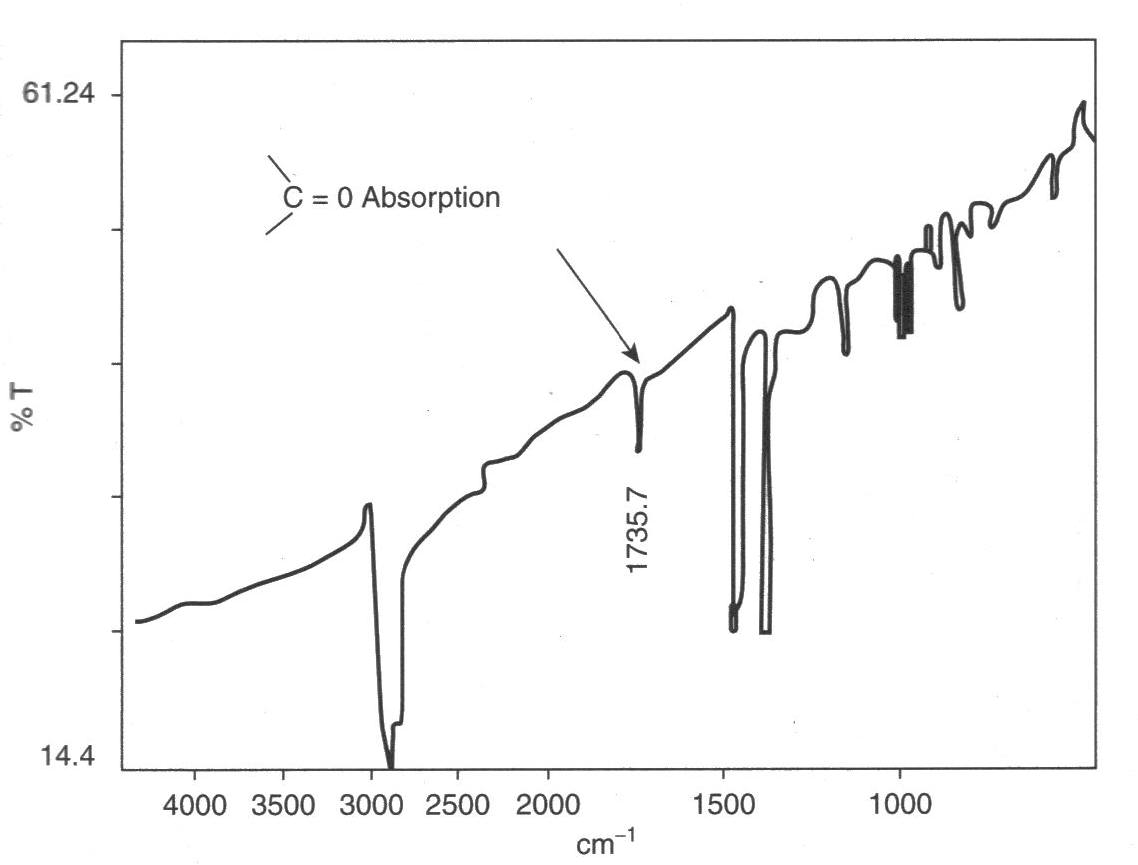
IR spectrum showing carbonyl absorption due to oxidative degradation of polypropylene crutch moulding.

Polymers are susceptible to attack by atmospheric oxygen, especially at elevated temperatures encountered during processing to shape. Many process methods such as extrusion and injection moulding involve pumping molten polymer into tools, and the high temperatures needed for melting may result in oxidation unless precautions are taken. For example, a forearm crutch suddenly snapped and the user was severely injured in the resulting fall. The crutch had fractured across a polypropylene insert within the aluminum tube of the device, and IR spectroscopy of the material showed that it had oxidized, possibly as a result of poor moulding.

Oxidation is usually relatively easy to detect, owing to the strong absorption by the carbonyl group in the spectrum of polyolefins. Polypropylene has a relatively simple spectrum, with few peaks at the carbonyl position (like polyethylene). Oxidation tends to start at tertiary carbon atoms because free radicals here are more stable, so last longer and are attacked by oxygen. The carbonyl group can be further oxidized to break the chain, so weakening the material by lowering the molecular weight, and cracks start to grow in the regions affected.

==== Ozonolysis ====
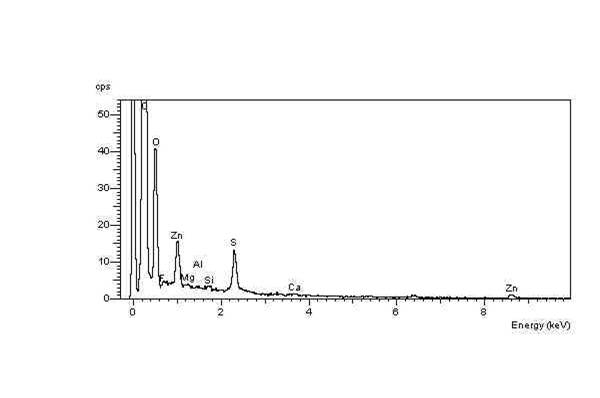
EDX spectrum of crack surface

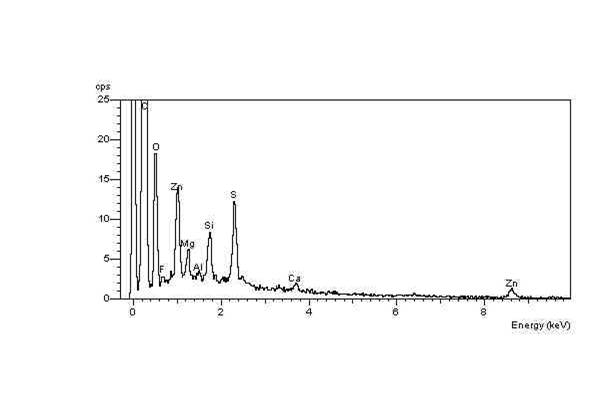
EDX spectrum of unaffected rubber surface

The reaction occurring between double bonds and ozone is known as ozonolysis when one molecule of the gas reacts with the double bond:

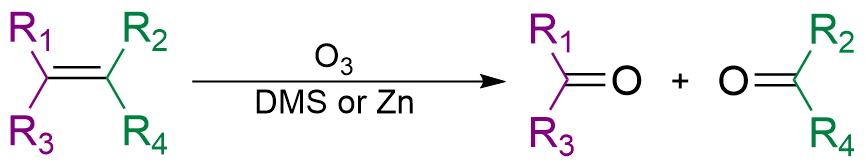
A generalized scheme of ozonolysis

The immediate result is formation of an ozonide, which then decomposes rapidly so that the double bond is cleaved. This is the critical step in chain breakage when polymers are attacked. The strength of polymers depends on the chain molecular weight or degree of polymerization: The higher the chain length the greater the mechanical strength (such as tensile strength). By cleaving the chain, the molecular weight drops rapidly and there comes a point when it has little strength whatsoever, and a crack forms. Further attack occurs in the freshly exposed crack surfaces and the crack grows steadily until it completes a circuit and the product separates or fails. In the case of a seal or a tube, failure occurs when the wall of the device is penetrated.

The carbonyl end groups that are formed are usually aldehydes or ketones, which can oxidize further to carboxylic acids. The net result is a high concentration of elemental oxygen on the crack surfaces, which can be detected using EDX in the ESEM. For example, two EDX spectra were obtained during an investigation into ozone cracking of diaphragm seals in a semiconductor fabrication factory. The EDX spectrum of the crack surface shows the high-oxygen peak compared with a constant sulfur peak. In contrast, the EDX spectrum of the unaffected elastomer surface spectrum shows a relatively low-oxygen peak compared with the sulfur peak.

== See also ==
- Absorption spectroscopy
- Forensic chemistry
- Forensic engineering
- Forensic polymer engineering
- Infrared spectroscopy correlation table
- Polymer degradation
- Polymer engineering
- Fluorescence spectroscopy
- Drug discovery
