= Synthetic rubber =

Any artificial elastomer

A synthetic rubber is an artificial elastomer. They are polymers synthesized from petroleum byproducts. About 32 million tonnes (35 million short tons; 31 million long tons) of rubber is produced annually in the United States, and of that amount two thirds are synthetic. Synthetic rubber, just like natural rubber, has many uses in the automotive industry for tires, door and window profiles, seals such as O-rings and gaskets, hoses, belts, matting, and flooring. They offer a different range of physical and chemical properties which can improve the reliability of a given product or application. Synthetic rubbers are superior to natural rubbers in two major respects: thermal stability, and resistance to oils and related compounds. They are more resistant to oxidizing agents, such as oxygen and ozone which can reduce the life of products like tires. Synthetic rubber is made from petroleum chemicals unlike other rubber that comes from chemicals in tree sap.

== History ==
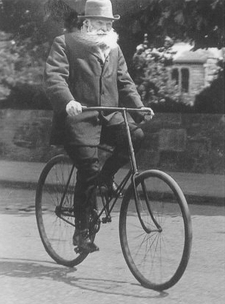
John Boyd Dunlop (c. 1915)

The expanded use of bicycles, and particularly their pneumatic tires, starting in the 1890s, created increased demand for rubber. In 1909, a team headed by Fritz Hofmann, working at the Bayer laboratory in Elberfeld, Germany, succeeded in polymerizing isoprene, making the first synthetic rubber.

Studies published in 1930 written independently by the Russian Sergey Lebedev, the American Wallace Carothers and the German scientist Hermann Staudinger led in 1931 to one of the first successful synthetic rubbers, known as neoprene, which was developed at DuPont under the direction of E. K. Bolton. Neoprene is highly resistant to heat and chemicals such as oil and gasoline, and is used in fuel hoses and as an insulating material in machinery. The company Thiokol applied their name to a competing type of rubber based on ethylene dichloride.

In 1935, German chemists synthesized the first of a series of synthetic rubbers known as Buna rubbers. These were copolymers, meaning the polymers were made up from two monomers in alternating sequence. Other brands included Koroseal, which Waldo Semon developed in 1935, and Sovprene, which Soviet researchers created in 1940.

=== World War II ===
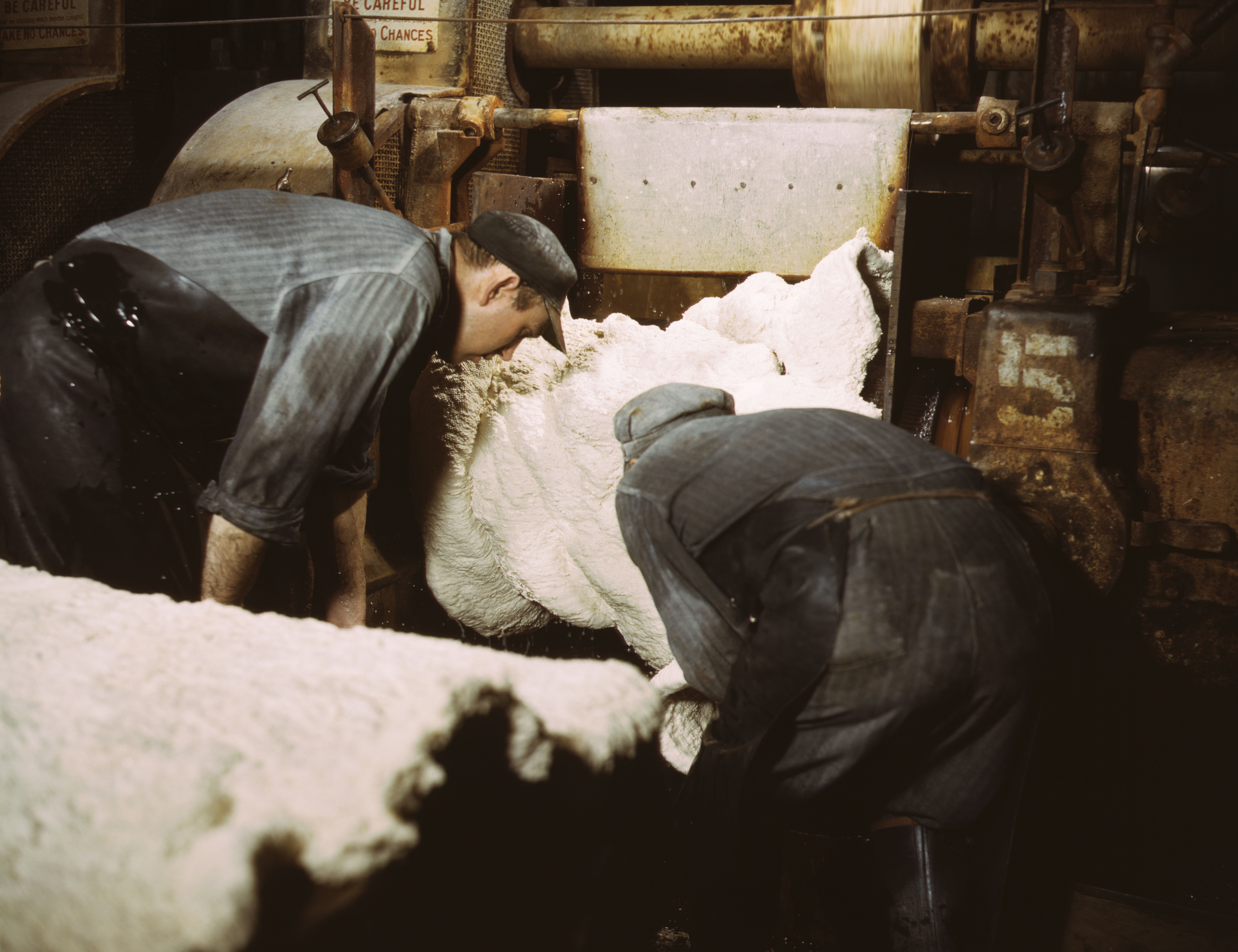
Sheet of synthetic rubber coming off the rolling mill at the plant of Goodrich (1941)

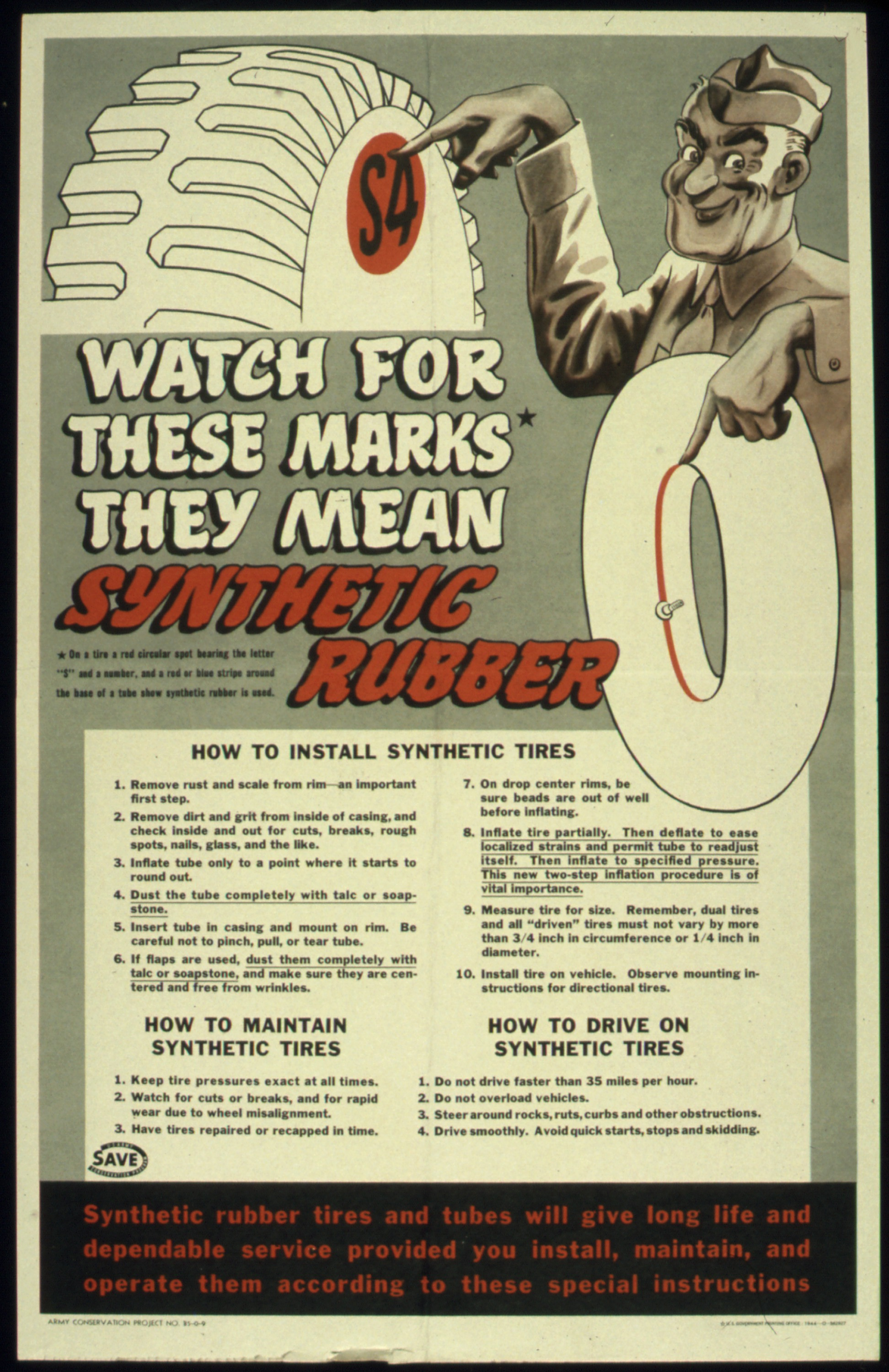
World War II poster about synthetic rubber tires

Production of synthetic rubber in the United States expanded greatly during World War II since the Axis powers controlled nearly all the world's limited supplies of natural rubber by mid-1942, following the Japanese conquest of most of Asia, particularly in the Southeast Asian colonies of British Malaya (Malaysia) and the Dutch East Indies (Indonesia) from where much of the global supply of natural rubber was sourced. However, production of synthetic rubber was still not sufficient to eliminate the threat that the U.S. would run out of rubber.

During the Allies' Operation Pointblank, bombing targets in Nazi Germany included the Schkopau plant (50,000 tons/yr) and the Hüls synthetic rubber plant near Recklinghausen (30,000, 17%), and the Kölnische Gummifäden Fabrik tire and tube plant at Deutz on the east bank of the Rhine. The synthetic rubber factory in Ferrara, Italy (near a river bridge) was bombed August 23, 1944. Three other synthetic rubber facilities were at Ludwigshafen/Oppau (15,000), Hanover/Limmer (reclamation, 20,000), and Leverkusen (5,000). A synthetic rubber plant at Oświęcim, in Nazi-occupied Poland, was under construction on March 5, 1944 operated by IG Farben and supplied by the SS with slave labor from the associated Monowitz concentration camp.

== Types ==
The most prevalent synthetic rubber is styrene-butadiene rubbers (SBR) derived from the copolymerization of styrene and 1,3-butadiene. Other synthetic rubbers include:

- polyisoprene, prepared by polymerization of isoprene
- neoprene, prepared by polymerization of 2-chlorobutadiene
- nitrile rubber made from cyanobutadiene or 2-propenenitrile and butadiene

Many variations of these can be prepared with mixtures of monomers and with various catalysts that allow for control of stereochemistry.

Polyisobutylene or butyl rubber is commonly used in tire inner tubes or linings because of its resistance to diffusion of air through the lining. It is a much less resilient material than cis-polybutadiene which is frequently used in tire sidewalls to minimize energy losses and heat build-up. It is so resilient that it is used in super balls. An elastomer widely used for external sheet such as roof coverings is Hypalon or chlorosulphonated polyethylene. Synthetic rubbers like EPR can also be used for electrical insulation.

=== Silicone rubber ===
Silicone rubber is also a synthetic elastomer composed of silicone polymers. Silicone rubbers are widely used in industry, and there are multiple formulations. Silicone rubbers are often one- or two-part polymers, and may contain fillers to improve properties or reduce cost. Silicone rubber is generally non-reactive, stable, and resistant to extreme environments and temperatures.

== Synthesis ==
Synthetic rubber is produced by polymerizing petroleum-based monomers. The manufacturing process has control over the molecular weight and properties of the synthetic rubber molecule (unlike in natural rubber). The synthesis mainly occurs through step-growth and chain-growth polymerization.

In step-growth polymerization, monomers or oligomers combine to form polymers through reactions such as condensation (releasing small byproducts) or polyaddition (without byproducts).

In chain-growth polymerization, polymer chains grow by adding monomers to reactive sites, initiated by radicals, ions, or coordination catalysts. This method includes initiation, propagation, and termination steps.

== Natural vs. synthetic rubber ==
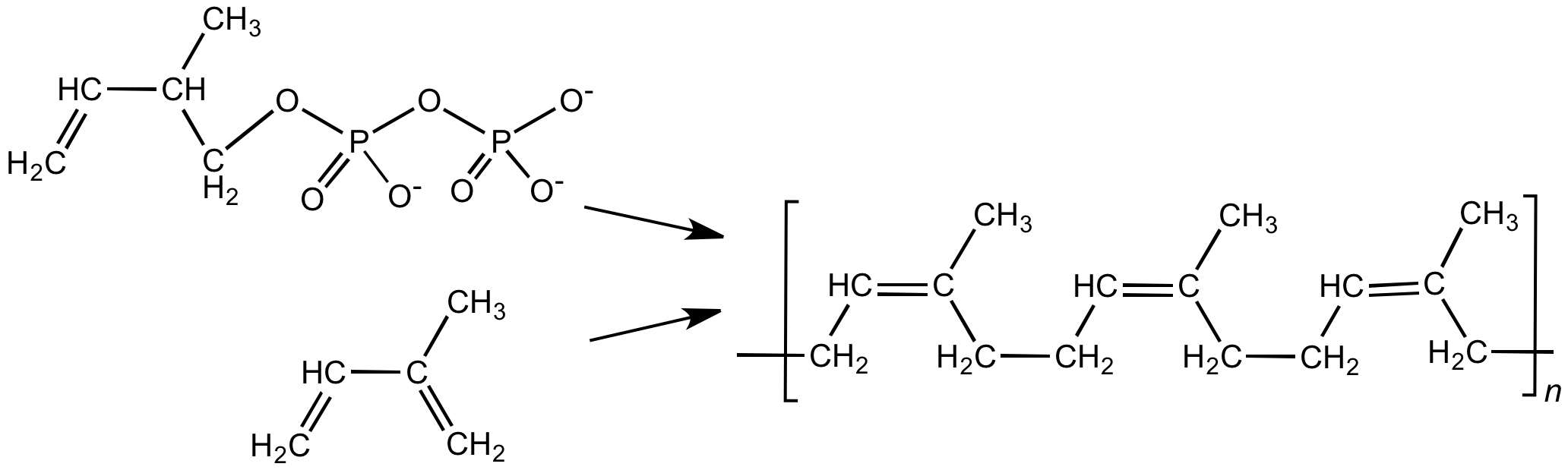
Chemical structure of cis-polyisoprene, the main constituent of natural rubber. Synthetic cis-polyisoprene and natural cis-polyisoprene are derived from different precursors by different chemical pathways.

Natural rubber, coming from latex of Hevea brasiliensis, is mainly poly-cis-isoprene.

Synthetic rubber, like most other man-made polymers, is made from various petroleum-based monomers.

Some synthetic rubbers are less sensitive to ozone cracking than natural rubber. Natural rubber is sensitive because of the double bonds in its chain structure, but some synthetic rubbers do not possess these bonds and so are more resistant to ozone cracking. Examples include Viton rubber, ethylene propylene diene monomer (EPDM), and butyl rubber.

A new class of synthetic rubber is the thermoplastic elastomers which can be moulded easily unlike conventional natural rubber vulcanized rubber. Their structure is stabilized by cross-linking by crystallites in the case of polyurethanes or by amorphous domains in the case of SBS block copolymers.
