= Diaphragm seal =

Mechanical seal made of a flexible membrane

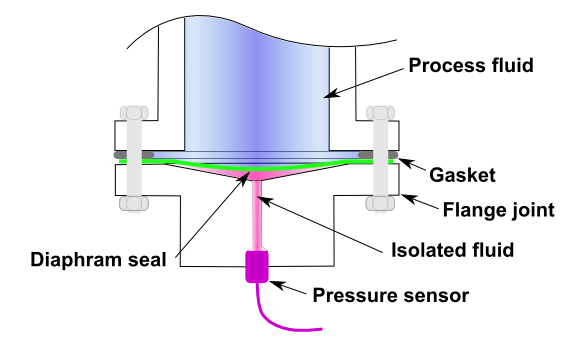
An example of a diaphragm seal (in green) used to protect a pressure sensor.

In mechanical engineering, a diaphragm seal is a flexible substance that seals and isolates an enclosure. The flexible nature of this seal allows pressure effects to cross the barrier but not the material being contained.

Common uses for diaphragm seals are to protect pressure sensors from the fluid whose pressure is being measured.

== Materials ==
Since diaphragm seals need to be highly flexible, elastomers are commonly used, and include a wide variety of both general purpose and speciality rubbers. Elastomers are limited to low pressure applications and those that are chemically compatible with the various plastics and rubbers used.

Metal diaphragms of stainless steel (several grades), Carpenter 20, Hastelloy, Monel, Inconel, tantalum, titanium and several other metals are in common use where high pressure ratings and specific chemical compatibility are required. Flanged assemblies or flush welded versions are available.

Depending on the PSI levels of the sealing application, the diaphragm may require fabric reinforcement. Typically, PSI under 5 does not require fabric reinforcement. A PSI between 5 and 10 is application dependent. Anything above 10 almost always needs fabric reinforcement.

== Applications ==
Diaphragm seals (also known as chemical seals or gauge guards) are also used to protect a process fluid from the pressure sensor. Examples of this use are:

- Sanitary processes (food, pharmaceuticals, etc.) where allowing process fluid to accumulate in the pressure port of the sensor would compromise the purity of the fluid (such as milk getting into the pressure port of a pressure gauge and spoiling)
- Very pure process fluids, where the metal surface of the pressure sensor might contaminate the fluid (such as copper ions from brass leaching into ultra pure water.)
- Pneumatic systems where small changes in pressures must be eliminated, such as those controlling air bearings.

== Seal failure ==
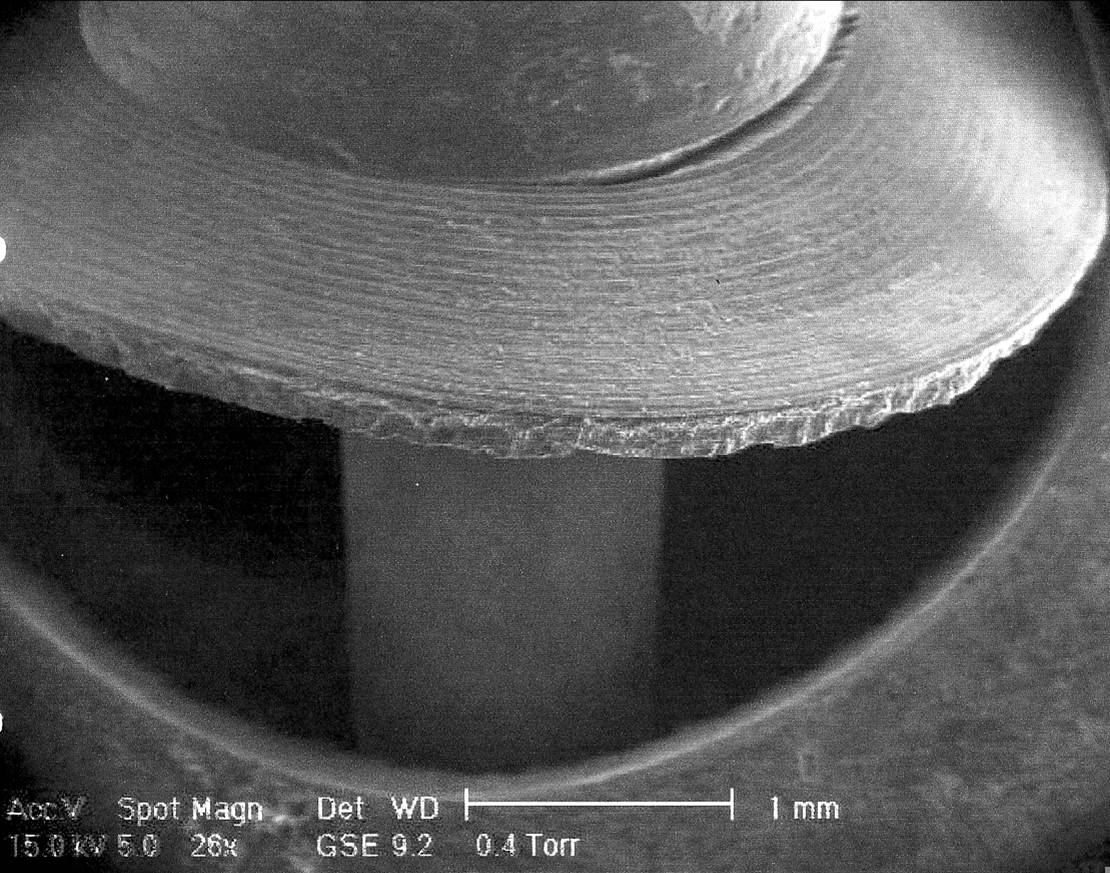
Environmental scanning electron microscope image of ozone cracks in NBR diaphragm seal formed at sharp corners in seal

Diaphragm seals are susceptible to failure via several mechanisms, including cracking. Ozone cracking can occur in many elastomers for example used in pneumatic systems. If the gas contaminates the air supply, then many rubber diaphragms are at risk from the problem.

== See also ==
- Diaphragm (mechanics)
- Polymer degradation
- Ozone cracking
