= Walter Bock =

German chemist (1895–1948)

- Born: 20 January 1895
- Died: 25 October 1948 (aged 53)
- Occupation: Chemist

Walter Bock (20 January 1895 – 25 October 1948) was a German chemist who developed styrene-butadiene copolymer by emulsion polymerization as a synthetic rubber (SBR).

== Early life ==
Walter Bock was born on January 10, 1895, in the small village of Wenzen (now part of Einbeck) in the Duchy of Brunswick. He was the fourth of nine children. His father, Wilhelm Bock, was the sole teacher in Wenzen. From 1905 to 1914 Bock attended high school in Brunswick.

Immediately after graduation he joined the army and served as an officer in World War I. He commanded an infantry company until he was wounded in July 1918. In October 1918 he began studying chemistry. After receiving his Ph.D. from the University of Göttingen in October 1921, Bock found employment as chemist at the Köln Rottweil AG in Premnitz. In the fall of 1924 Bock joined the Dr. Zellner laboratories in Berlin, where he took charge of the chemical-pharmaceutical department.

== Work on synthetic rubber ==
In spring 1926 Bock successfully applied for a job at the IG Farben, which was formed in December 1925. In April 1926 he began in the IG plant in Leverkusen with research work on synthetic rubber. His place of work was in the research laboratory of the so called "A-Fabrik". The head of this department was Eduard Tschunkur.

Bock focused on emulsion polymerization, which had been already invented in 1912 by Kurt Gottlob (1881–1925) at Bayer, but had so far yielded no practical application. Walter Bock and his colleague Claus Heuck independently improved the emulsion process by introducing new emulsifiers. Bock also discovered that peroxy compounds are effective initiators in the emulsion polymerization of conjugated diolefines. But Bock and Heuck failed to gain good, economically feasible synthetic rubbers by this process. Polymers of butadiene and isoprene had good elasticity after vulcanization, but were crumbly. Polymers of dimethyl butadiene had good tensile strength, but nearly no elasticity.

In the fall of 1928 Bock had the idea to copolymerize dimethyl butadiene with isoprene and butadiene, respectively, to combine the positive mechanical properties. The result was encouraging. Both synthetic rubbers had mechanical properties almost comparable with natural rubber.

In spring 1929 Bock replaced dimethyl butadiene by styrene. The styrene-butadiene rubber (SBR), which he synthesized from styrene and butadiene as comonomers, was superior to natural rubber in abrasion properties and therefore especially useful for tire applications. The rubber was marketed with the brand name Buna S. Even today SBR is the most successful synthetic rubber in terms of trade volume (together with Polybutadiene (BR)).

== Death ==
Bock worked for IG Farben until his early death in 1948. His death was mysterious. On October 15, 1948, Bock was reported missing by his family. Ten days later, on October 25, 1948, his dead body was found in the River Rhine in Cologne near his home. The case was never solved.

== Awards and honours ==
In 1979 Walter Bock was inducted into the International Rubber Science Hall of Fame.
