= Hypalon =

Synthetic rubber

Hypalon is a chlorosulfonated polyethylene (CSPE) synthetic rubber (CSM) noted for its resistance to chemicals, temperature extremes, and ultraviolet light. It was a product of DuPont Performance Elastomers, a subsidiary of DuPont. Hypalon as it is now known in the marine industry today is a remarketed version of the old Hypalon using an additional layer of neoprene (cr) so the new chemical formulation is csm/cr.

== Chemical structure ==
Polyethylene is treated with a mixture of chlorine and sulfur dioxide under UV-radiation. The product contains 20-40% chlorine. The polymer also contains a few percent chlorosulfonyl (ClSO_{2}-) groups. These reactive groups allow for vulcanization, which strongly affects the physical durability of the products. An estimated 110,000 tons/y were produced in 1991.

=== Synthesis ===
Typically, low-density polyethylene (LDPE) or high-density polyethylene (HDPE) serves as the raw material. The polymer is treated with chlorine gas (Cl_{2}) and sulfur dioxide (SO_{2}), or alternatively with sulfuryl chloride (SO_{2}Cl_{2}), in the presence of a radical initiator.

The reaction follows a free-radical substitution mechanism. Chlorine atoms replace hydrogen along the chain, disrupting the crystallinity of the polyethylene and providing elastomeric properties. Simultaneously, sulfonyl chloride groups (-SO_{2}Cl) are introduced, which serve as reactive sites for cross-linking.

The general reaction can be represented as:

$(-[CH_2-CH_2]_n-) + SO_2 + Cl_2 \xrightarrow{\text{initiator}} (-[CH_2-CH(Cl)]_x-[CH_2-CH(SO_2Cl)]_y-) + HCl$

Commercial grades typically contain 20–45% chlorine and 1–2% sulfur by weight.

=== Cross-linking (Curing) ===
Unlike natural rubber, which is typically vulcanized using sulfur, CSM is cured using metal oxides. The sulfonyl chloride groups react with the metal oxide—typically magnesium oxide (MgO), lead(II) oxide (PbO), or zinc oxide (ZnO)—in the presence of accelerators and fatty acids to form stable cross-links.

The cross-linking mechanism forms a metal sulfonate bridge:

$2 \text{ R-SO}_2Cl + \text{MgO} + \text{H}_2\text{O} \rightarrow \text{R-SO}_2\text{-O-Mg-O-SO}_2\text{-R} + \text{MgCl}_2$

== Discontinuance ==
DuPont Performance Elastomers announced on May 7, 2009, that it intended to close its manufacturing plant in Beaumont, Texas, by June 30, 2009. This was DPE's sole plant for CSM materials. The company was therefore exiting the business for Hypalon and its related product, Acsium. The plant closure was delayed until April 20, 2010, in response to customer requests.

=== Current production ===
Following DuPont's exit, the material continues to be manufactured globally, most notably by Tosoh Corporation in Japan (under the name Toso-CSM) and various manufacturers in China. In the marine industry, the term "Hypalon" persists as a colloquial name for CSM-coated fabrics used in boat construction, such as those produced by Pennel & Flipo (ORCA fabric).

== Properties ==
CSM is valued for specific properties that distinguish it from other elastomers like polychloroprene (Neoprene) or EPDM:

- Weather Resistance: Exceptional resistance to UV degradation and ozone cracking.
- Chemical Resistance: High resistance to corrosive chemicals, including strong acids and bases.
- Thermal Stability: Operational temperature range typically from −40 °C to +150 °C.
- Color Stability: Unlike many rubbers, CSM can be compounded in light colors without degrading in sunlight.

== Applications ==
=== Marine industry ===
One of the most visible applications of CSM is in the construction of Rigid Inflatable Boats (RIBs) and high-end inflatable tenders. The material is preferred over PVC for professional and military use due to its longevity and resistance to salt water and sunlight.

=== Construction and automotive ===
- Roofing: Single-ply roofing membranes for flat roofs.
- Automotive: Power steering hoses, timing belts, and fuel lines requiring heat and oil resistance.
- Wire and Cable: Jacketing for electrical cables in harsh industrial environments.
