= Polybutadiene =

Type of synthetic rubber formed from the polymerization of butadiene

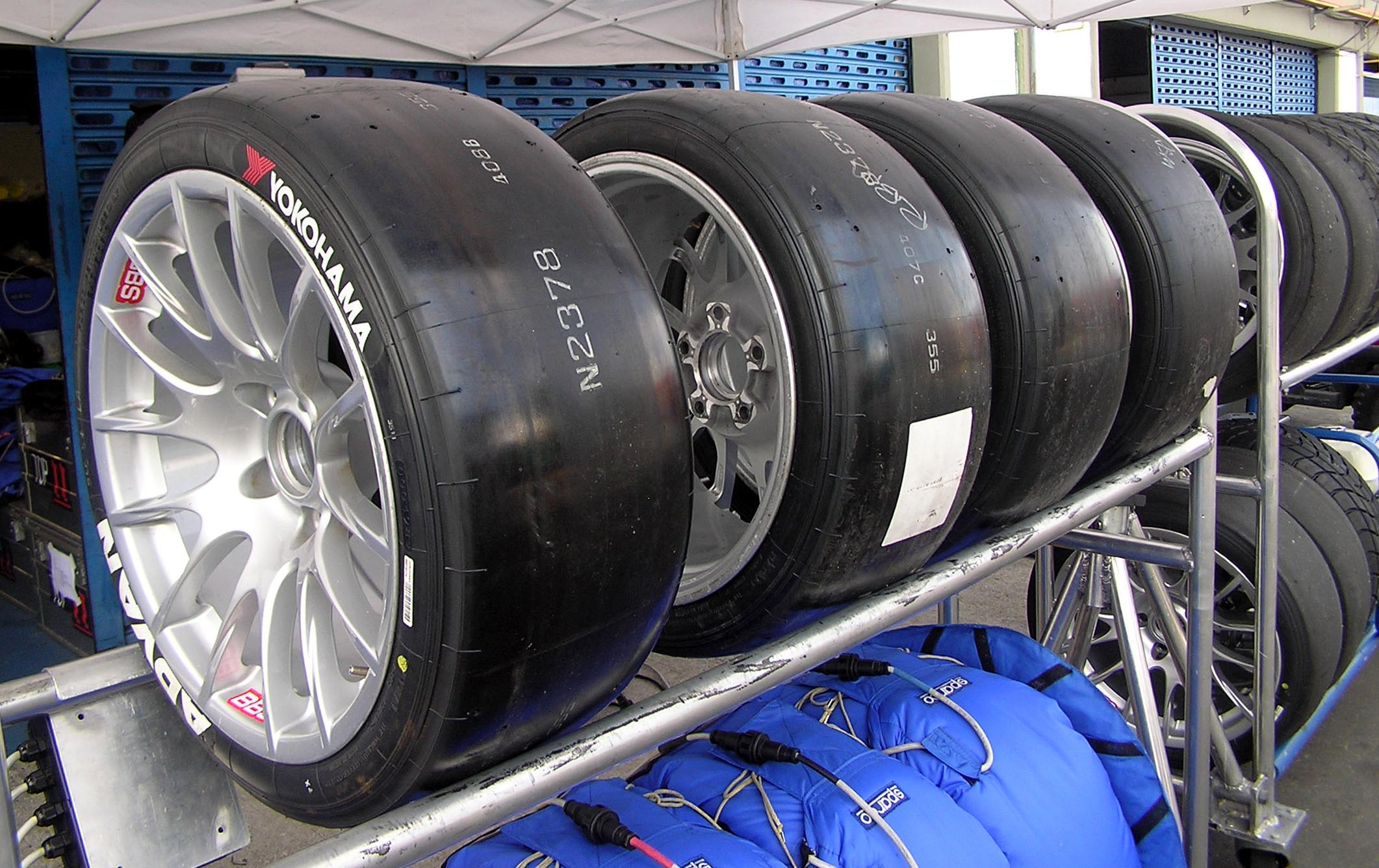
About 70% of polybutadiene is used in tire manufacturing.

Polybutadiene [butadiene rubber, BR] is a synthetic rubber. It offers high elasticity, high resistance to wear, good strength even without fillers, and excellent abrasion resistance when filled and vulcanized. "Polybutadiene" is a collective name for homopolymers formed from the polymerization of the monomer 1,3-butadiene. The IUPAC refers to polybutadiene as "poly(buta-1,3-diene)". Historically, an early generation of synthetic polybutadiene rubber produced in Germany by Bayer using sodium as a catalyst was known as "Buna rubber". Polybutadiene is typically crosslinked with sulphur, however, it has also been shown that it can be UV cured when bis-benzophenone additives are incorporated into the formulation.

Polybutadiene rubber (BR) accounted for about 28% of total global consumption of synthetic rubbers in 2020, whereas styrene-butadiene rubber (SBR) was by far the most important grade (S-SBR 12%, E-SBR 27% of the entire synthetic rubber market). It is mainly used in the manufacture of tires, which consumes about 70% of the production. Another 25% is used as an additive to improve the toughness (impact resistance) of plastics such as polystyrene and acrylonitrile butadiene styrene (ABS). Polybutadiene is also used to manufacture golf balls, various elastic objects and to coat or encapsulate electronic assemblies, offering high electrical resistivity.

== History ==
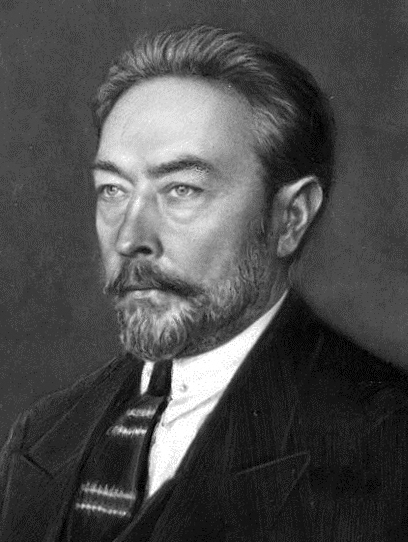
Sergei Vasilyevich Lebedev, a Russian chemist, was the first to polymerize butadiene.

The Russian chemist Sergei Vasilyevich Lebedev was the first to polymerize butadiene in 1910. In 1926 he invented a process for manufacturing butadiene from ethanol, and in 1928, developed a method for producing polybutadiene using sodium as a catalyst.

The government of the Soviet Union strove to use polybutadiene as an alternative to natural rubber and built the first pilot plant in 1930, using ethanol produced from potatoes. The experiment was a success and in 1936 the Soviet Union built the world's first polybutadiene plant in which the butadiene was obtained from petroleum. By 1940, the Soviet Union was by far the largest producer of polybutadiene with 50,000 tons per year.

Following Lebedev's work, other industrialized countries such as Germany and the United States developed polybutadiene and SBR as an alternative to natural rubber.

In the mid-1950s there were major advances in the field of catalysts that led to the development of an improved versions of polybutadiene. The leading manufacturers of tires and some petrochemical companies began to build polybutadiene plants on all inhabited continents; the boom lasted until the 1973 oil crisis. Since then, the growth rate of the production has been more modest, focused mainly in the Far East.

In Germany, scientists from Bayer (at the time a part of the conglomerate IG Farben) reproduced Lebedev's processes of producing polybutadiene by using sodium as a catalyst. For this, they used the trade name Buna, derived from Bu for butadiene, Na for sodium (natrium in Latin, Natrium in German). They discovered that the addition of styrene to the process resulted in better properties, and thus opted for this route. They had invented styrene-butadiene, which was named Buna-S (S for styrene).

Although the Goodrich Corporation had successfully developed a process for producing polybutadiene in 1939, the U.S. federal government opted for the use of Buna-S to develop its synthetic-rubber industry after its entry into the World War II, using patents of IG Farben obtained via Standard Oil. Because of this, there was little industrial production of polybutadiene in America during this time.

After the war, the production of synthetic rubber was in decline due to the decrease in demand when natural rubber was readily available again. However, interest was renewed in the mid-1950s after the discovery of the Ziegler–Natta catalyst. This method proved to be much better for tire manufacturing than the old sodium polybutadiene. The following year, Firestone Tire and Rubber Company was first to produce low cis polybutadiene using butyllithium as a catalyst.

The relatively high production costs were a hindrance to commercial development until 1960 when production on a commercial scale began. Tire manufacturers like Goodyear Tire and Rubber Company and Goodrich were the first to produce plants for high cis polybutadiene, this was followed by oil companies like Shell and chemical manufacturers such as Bayer.

Initially, with plants built in the United States and France, Firestone enjoyed a monopoly on low cis polybutadiene, licensing it to plants in Japan and the United Kingdom. In 1965, the Japanese JSR Corporation developed its own low cis process and began licensing it during the next decade.

The 1973 oil crisis marked a halt to the growth of synthetic rubber production; the expansion of existing plants almost ceased for a few years. Since then, the construction of new plants has mainly taken place in industrializing countries in the Far East (such as South Korea, Taiwan, Thailand, and China), while Western countries have chosen to increase the capacity of existing plants.

In 1987, Bayer started to use neodymium-based catalysts to catalyze polybutadiene. Soon thereafter other manufacturers deployed related technologies such as EniChem (1993) and Petroflex (2002).

In the early 2000s, the synthetic rubber industry was once again hit by one of its periodic crises. The world's largest producer of polybutadiene, Bayer, went through major restructuring as it was troubled by financial losses; between 2002 and 2005 it closed its cobalt-polybutadiene plants in Sarnia (Canada) and Marl (Germany), transferring their production to neodymium plants in Port Jérôme (France) and Orange (USA). During the same time, the synthetic rubber business was transferred from Bayer to Lanxess, a company founded in 2004 when Bayer spun off its chemicals operations and parts of its polymer activities.

== Polymerization of butadiene ==
1,3-Butadiene is an organic compound that is a simple conjugated diene hydrocarbon (dienes have two carbon-carbon double bonds). Polybutadiene forms by linking many 1,3-butadiene monomers to make a much longer polymer chain molecule. In terms of the connectivity of the polymer chain, butadiene can polymerize in three different ways, called cis, trans and vinyl. The cis and trans forms arise by connecting the butadiene molecules end-to-end, so-called 1,4-polymerisation. The properties of the resulting isomeric forms of polybutadiene differ. For example, "high cis"-polybutadiene has a high elasticity and is very popular, whereas the so-called "high trans" is a plastic crystal with few useful applications. The vinyl content of polybutadiene is typically no more than a few percent. In addition to these three kinds of connectivity, polybutadienes differ in terms of their branching and molecular weights.

The trans double bonds formed during polymerization allow the polymer chain to stay rather straight, allowing sections of polymer chains to align to form microcrystalline regions in the material. The cis double bonds cause a bend in the polymer chain, preventing polymer chains from aligning to form crystalline regions, which results in larger regions of amorphous polymer. It has been found that a substantial percentage of cis double bond configurations in the polymer will result in a material with flexible elastomer (rubber-like) qualities. In free radical polymerization, both cis and trans double bonds will form in percentages that depend on temperature. The catalysts influence the cis vs trans ratio.

=== Types ===
The catalyst used in the production significantly affects the type of polybutadiene product.

Typical polybutadiene composition by catalyst
Catalyst	Molar proportion (%)		
Catalyst	cis	trans	vinyl
Neodymium	98	1	1
Cobalt	96	2	2
Nickel	96	3	1
Titanium	93	3	4
Lithium	10–30	20–60	10–70

==== High cis polybutadiene ====
This type is characterized by a high proportion of cis (typically over 92%) and a small proportion of vinyl (less than 4%). It is manufactured using Ziegler–Natta catalysts based on transition metals. Depending on the metal used, the properties vary slightly.

Using cobalt gives branched molecules, resulting in a low viscosity material that is easy to use, but its mechanical strength is relatively low. Neodymium gives the most linear structure (and therefore higher mechanical strength) and a higher percentage of 98% cis. Other less-used catalysts include nickel and titanium.

==== Low cis polybutadiene ====
Using an alkyllithium (e.g. butyllithium) as the catalyst produces a polybutadiene called "low cis" which typically contains 36% cis, 54% trans and 10% vinyl.

Despite its high liquid-glass transition, low cis polybutadiene is used in tire manufacturing and is blended with other tire polymers, also it can be advantageously used as an additive in plastics due to its low contents of gels.

==== High vinyl polybutadiene ====
In 1980, researchers from the Japanese company, Zeon, discovered that high-vinyl polybutadiene (over 70%), despite having a high liquid-glass transition, could be advantageously used in combination with high cis in tires. This material is produced with an alkyllithium catalyst.

==== High trans polybutadiene ====
Polybutadiene can be produced with more than 90% trans using catalysts similar to those of high cis: neodymium, lanthanum, nickel. This material is a plastic crystal (i.e. not an elastomer) which melts at about 80 °C. It was formerly used for the outer layer of golf balls. Today it is only used industrially, but companies like Ube are investigating other possible applications.

==== Other ====
===== Metallocene polybutadiene =====
The use of metallocene catalysts to polymerize butadiene is being explored by Japanese researchers. The benefits seem to be a higher degree of control both in the distribution of molecular mass and the proportion of cis/trans/vinyl. As of 2006, no manufacturer produces "metallocene polybutadiene" on a commercial basis.

===== Copolymers =====
1,3-butadiene is normally copolymerized with other types of monomers such as styrene and acrylonitrile to form rubbers or plastics with various qualities. The most common form is styrene-butadiene copolymer, which is a commodity material for car tires. It is also used in block copolymers and tough thermoplastics such as ABS plastic. This way a copolymer material can be made with good stiffness, hardness, and toughness. Because the chains have a double bond in each and every repeat unit, the material is sensitive to ozone cracking.

== Production ==
The annual production of polybutadiene was 2.0 million tons in 2003. This makes it the second most produced synthetic rubber by volume, behind the styrene-butadiene rubber (SBR).

The production processes of high cis polybutadiene and low cis used to be quite different and were carried out in separate plants. Lately, the trend has changed to use a single plant to produce as many different types of rubber as possible, including, low cis polybutadiene, high cis (with neodymium used as a catalyst) and SBR.

=== Processing ===
Polybutadiene rubber is seldom used alone, but is instead mixed with other rubbers. Polybutadiene is difficult to band in a two roll mixing mill. Instead, a thin sheet of polybutadiene may be prepared and kept separate. Then, after proper mastication of natural rubber, the polybutadiene rubber may be added to the two roll mixing mill. A similar practice may be adopted, for example, if polybutadiene is to be mixed with Styrene Butadiene Rubber (SBR). *Polybutadiene rubber may be added with Styrene as an impact modifier. High dosages may affect clarity of Styrene.

In an internal mixer, natural rubber and/or styrene-butadiene rubber may be placed first, followed by polybutadiene.

The plasticity of polybutadiene is not reduced by excessive mastication.

== Uses ==
The annual production of polybutadiene is 2.1 million tons (2000). This makes it the second most produced synthetic rubber by volume, behind styrene-butadiene rubber (SBR).

=== Tires ===
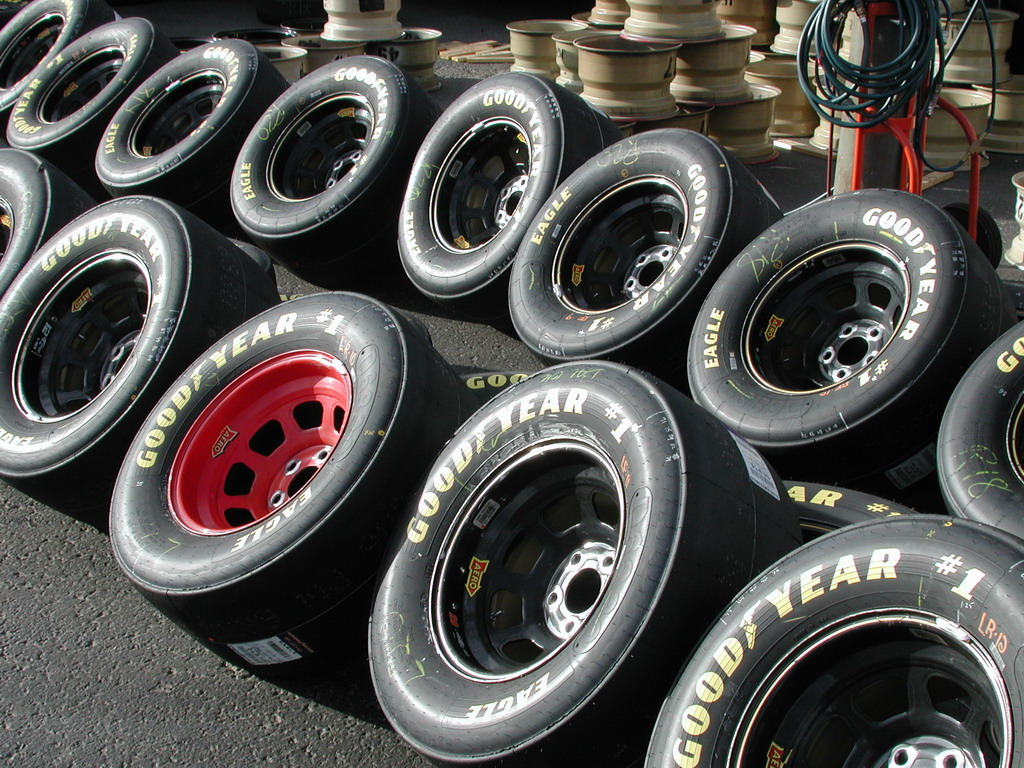
Racing tires

Polybutadiene is largely used in various parts of automobile tires; the manufacture of tires consumes about 70% of the world production of polybutadiene, with a majority of it being high cis. The polybutadiene is used primarily in the sidewall of truck tires, helping to improve fatigue to failure life due to the continuous flexing during run. As a result, tires will not blow out in extreme service conditions. It is also used in the tread portion of giant truck tires to improve the abrasion, i.e. less wearing, and to run the tire comparatively cool, since a very small proportion of the energy from flexing is converted into heat. Both parts are formed by extrusion.

Its main competitors in this application are styrene-butadiene rubber (SBR) and natural rubber. Polybutadiene has the advantage compared to SBR in its lower liquid-glass transition temperature, which gives it a high resistance to wear and a low rolling resistance. This gives the tires a long life and low fuel consumption. However, the lower transition temperature also lowers the friction on wet surfaces, which is why polybutadiene almost always is used in combination with any of the other two elastomers. About 1 kg of polybutadiene is used per tire in automobiles, and 3.3 kg in utility vehicles.

=== Plastics ===
About 25% of the produced polybutadiene is used to improve the mechanical properties of plastics, in particular of high-impact polystyrene (HIPS) and to a lesser extent acrylonitrile butadiene styrene (ABS). The addition of between 4 and 12% polybutadiene to polystyrene transforms it from a fragile and delicate material to a ductile and resistant one.

The quality of the process is more important in the use in plastics than in tires, especially when it comes to color and content of gels which have to be as low as possible. In addition, the products need to meet a list of health requirements due to its use in the food industry.

=== Golf balls ===
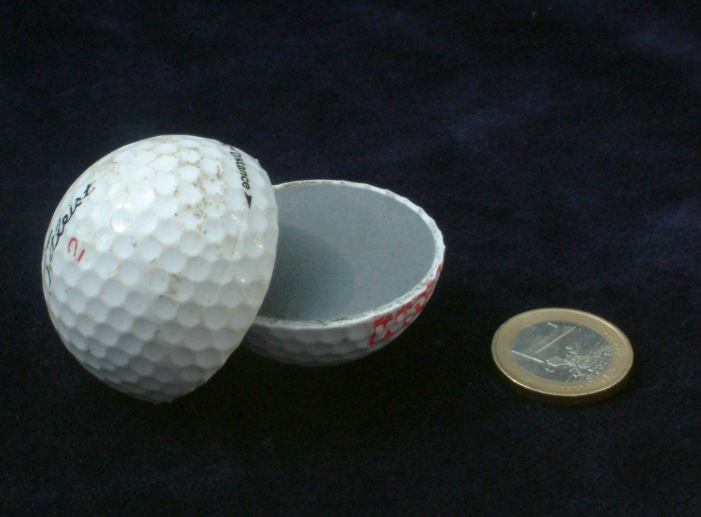
A cross section of a golf ball; its core consists of polybutadiene.

Most golf balls are made of an elastic core of polybutadiene surrounded by a layer of a harder material. Polybutadiene is preferred to other elastomers due to its high resilience.

The core of the balls are formed by compression molding with chemical reactions. First, polybutadiene is mixed with additives, then extruded, pressed using a calender and cut into pieces which are placed in a mold. The mold is subjected to high pressure and high temperature for about 30 minutes, enough time to vulcanize the material.

The golf ball production consumes about 20,000 tonnes of polybutadiene per year (1999).

=== Other uses ===
- Polybutadiene rubber may be used in the inner tube of hoses for sandblasting, along with natural rubber, to increase resilience. This rubber can also be used in the cover of hoses, mainly pneumatic and water hoses.
- Polybutadiene rubber can also be used in railway pads, bridge blocks, etc.
- Polybutadiene rubber can be blended with nitrile rubber for easy processing. However large use may affect the oil resistance of nitrile rubber.
- Polybutadiene is used in the manufacturing of the high-restitution toy Super Ball. Due to the high resilience property, 100% polybutadiene rubber based vulcanizate is used as crazy balls—i.e. a ball if dropped from 6th floor of a house will rebound up to 5½ to 6th floor (assuming no air resistance).
- Polybutadiene is also used as binder in combination with an oxidizer and a fuel in various Solid Rocket Boosters such as Japan's H-IIB launch vehicle, and ESA's Ariane 5; commonly is employed as hydroxyl-terminated polybutadiene (HTPB) or carboxyl-terminated polybutadiene (CTPB).

== See also ==
- Ozone cracking
- Polymer degradation
