= Ozone cracking =

Cracks in many different elastomers due to ozone attack

Ozone Cracking

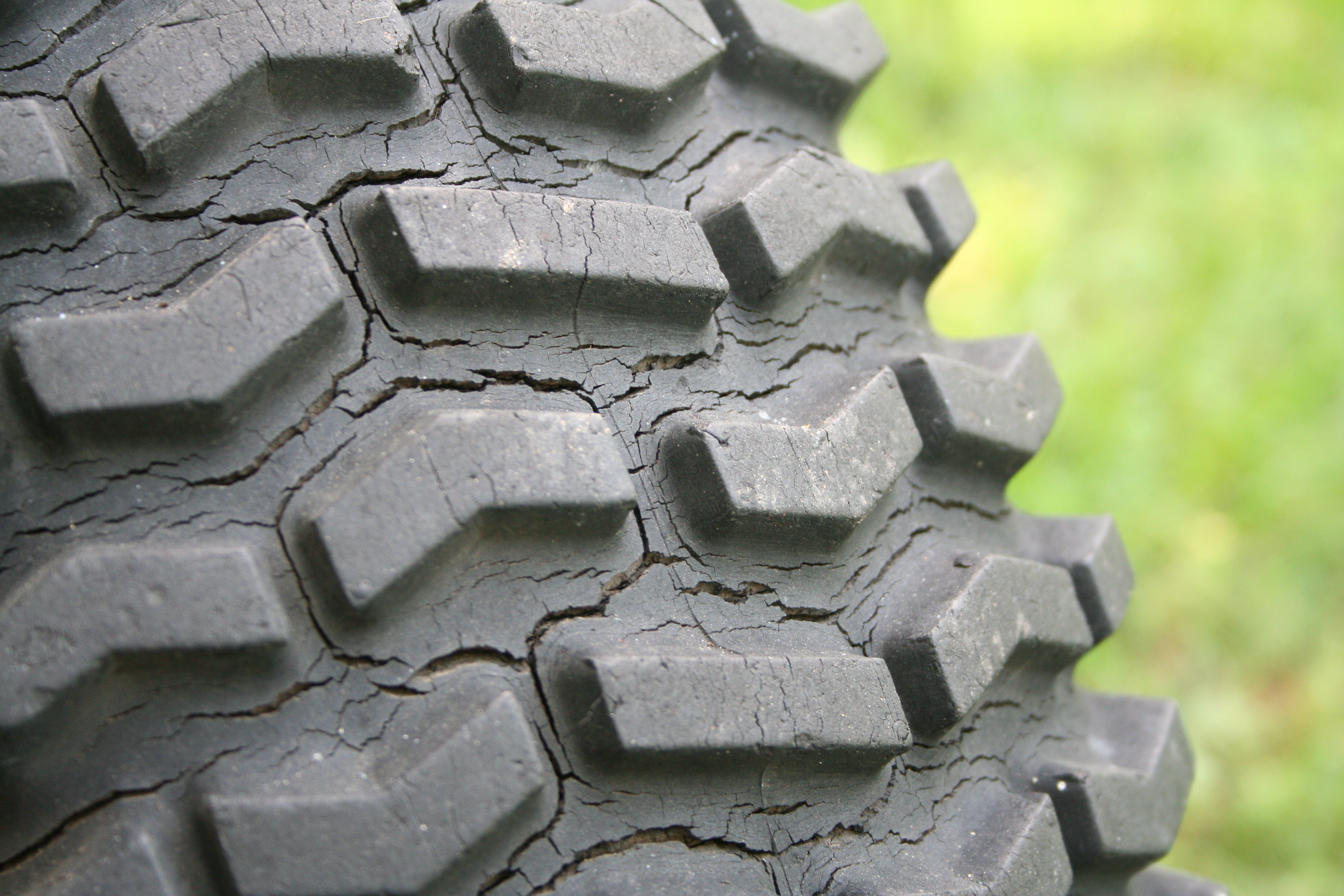
A vehicle tire showing signs of ozone cracking

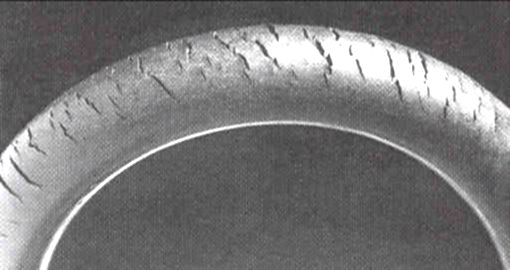
Ozone cracking in natural rubber tubing

Cracks can be formed in many different elastomers by ozone attack, and the characteristic form of attack of vulnerable rubbers is known as ozone cracking. The problem was formerly very common, especially in tires, but is now rarely seen in those products owing to preventive measures.

However, it does occur in many other safety-critical items such as fuel lines and rubber seals, such as gaskets and O-rings, where ozone attack is considered unlikely. Only a trace amount of the gas is needed to initiate cracking, and so these items can also succumb to the problem.

== Susceptible elastomers ==
Tiny traces of ozone in the air will attack double bonds in rubber chains, with natural rubber, polybutadiene, styrene-butadiene rubber and nitrile rubber being most sensitive to degradation. Every repeat unit in the first three materials has a double bond, so every unit can be degraded by ozone. Nitrile rubber is a copolymer of butadiene and acrylonitrile units, but the proportion of acrylonitrile is usually lower than butadiene, so attack occurs. Butyl rubber is more resistant but still has a small number of double bonds in its chains, so attack is possible. Exposed surfaces are attacked first, the density of cracks varying with ozone gas concentration. The higher the concentration, the greater the number of cracks formed.

Ozone-resistant elastomers include EPDM, fluoroelastomers like Viton and polychloroprene rubbers like Neoprene. Attack is less likely because double bonds form a very small proportion of the chains, and with the latter, the chlorination reduces the electron density in the double bonds, therefore lowering their propensity to react with ozone. Silicone rubber, Hypalon and polyurethanes are also ozone-resistant.

== Form of cracking ==
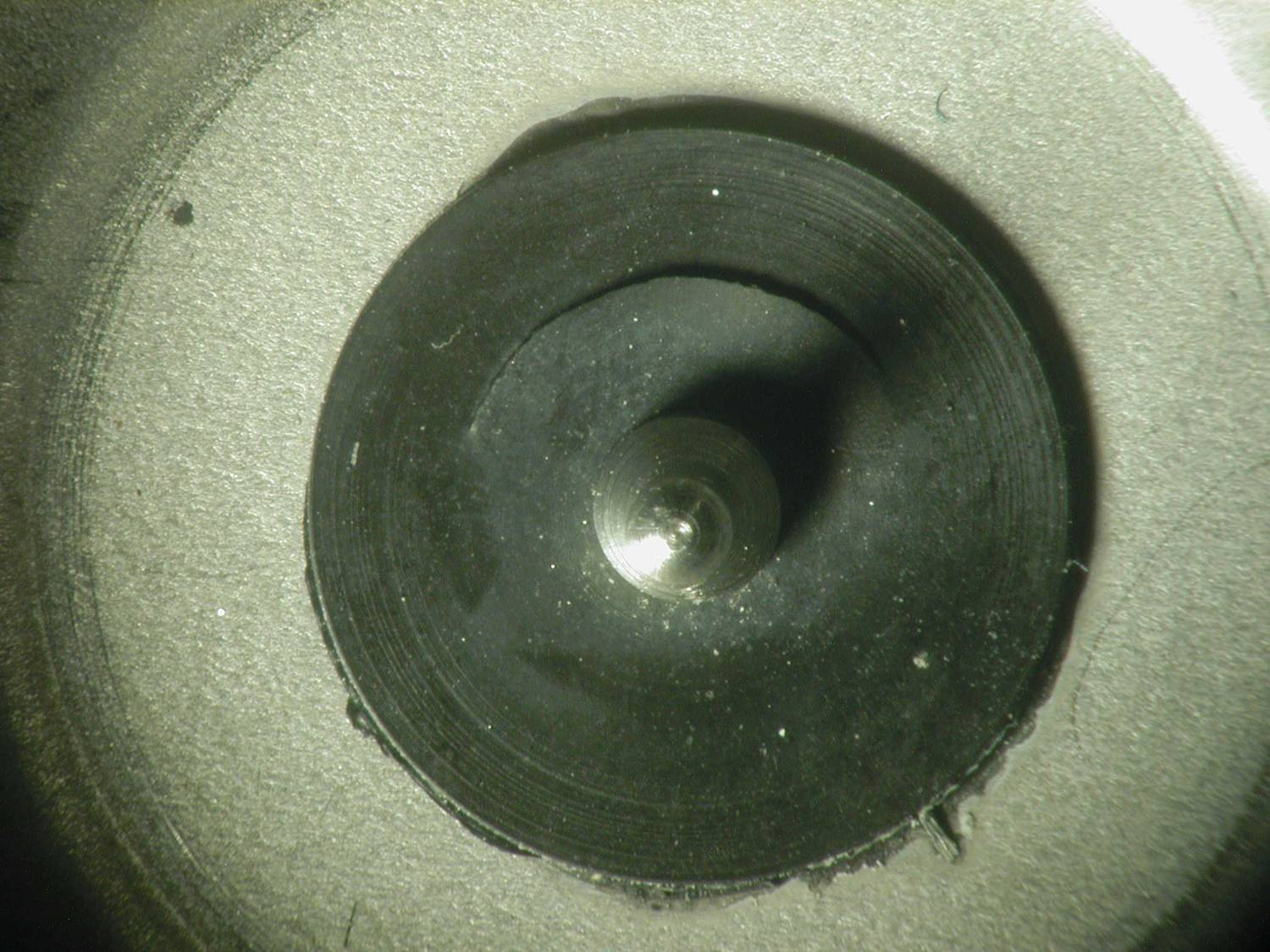
Macrophotograph of ozone cracking in NBR (Nitrile Butadiene Rubber) diaphragm seal

Ozone cracks form in products under tension, but the critical strain is very small. The cracks are always oriented at right angles to the strain axis, so will form around the circumference in a rubber tube bent over. Such cracks are very dangerous when they occur in fuel pipes because the cracks will grow from the outside exposed surfaces into the bore of the pipe, so fuel leakage and fire may follow. Seals are also susceptible to attack, such as diaphragm seals in air lines. Such seals are often critical for the operation of pneumatic controls, and if a crack penetrates the seal, all functions of the system can be lost. Nitrile rubber seals are commonly used in pneumatic systems because of its oil resistance. However, if ozone gas is present, cracking will occur in the seals unless preventative measures are taken.

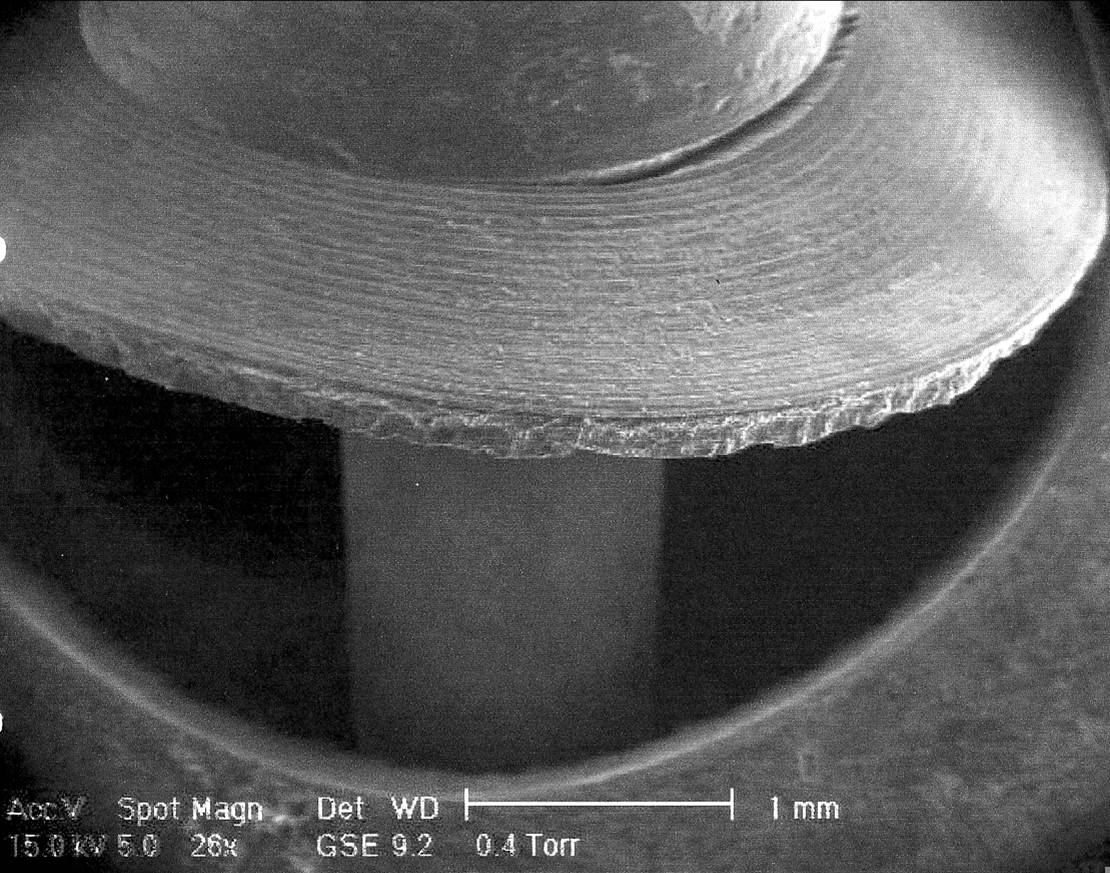
Environmental scanning electron microscope image of ozone cracks in NBR diaphragm seal formed at sharp corners in seal

Ozone attack will occur at the most sensitive zones in a seal, especially sharp corners where the strain is greatest when the seal is flexing in use. The corners represent stress concentrations, so the tension is at a maximum when the diaphragm of the seal is bent under air pressure.

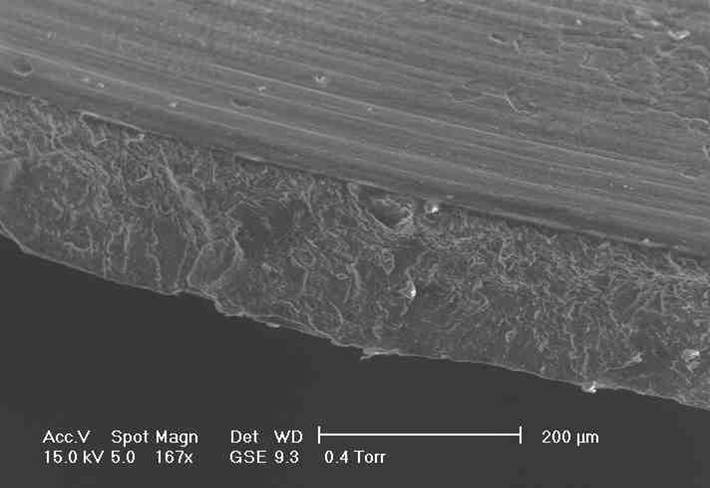
Close-up of ozone crack (using ESEM) in NBR diaphragm seal

The seal shown at left failed from traces of ozone at circa 1 ppm, and once cracking had started, it continued as long as the gas was present. This particular failure led to loss of production on a semi-conductor fabrication line. The problem was solved by adding effective filters in the air line and by modifying the design to eliminate the very sharp corners. An ozone-resistant elastomer such as Viton was also considered as a replacement for the Nitrile rubber. The pictures were taken using ESEM for maximum resolution.

== Ozonolysis ==
The reaction occurring between double bonds and ozone is known as ozonolysis when one molecule of the gas reacts with the double bond:

A generalized scheme of ozonolysis

The immediate result is formation of an ozonide, which then decomposes rapidly so that the double bond is cleaved. This is the critical step in chain breakage when polymers are attacked. The strength of polymers depends on the chain molecular weight or degree of polymerization, the higher the chain length, the greater the mechanical strength (such as tensile strength). By cleaving the chain, the molecular weight drops rapidly and there comes a point when it has little strength whatsoever, and a crack forms. Further attack occurs in the freshly exposed crack surfaces and the crack grows steadily until it completes a circuit and the product separates or fails. In the case of a seal or a tube, failure occurs when the wall of the device is penetrated.

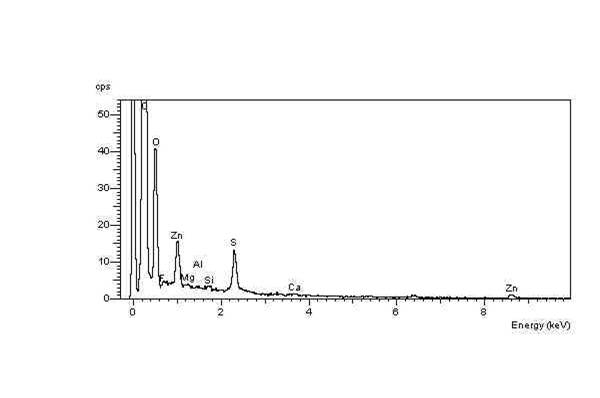
EDX spectrum of crack surface

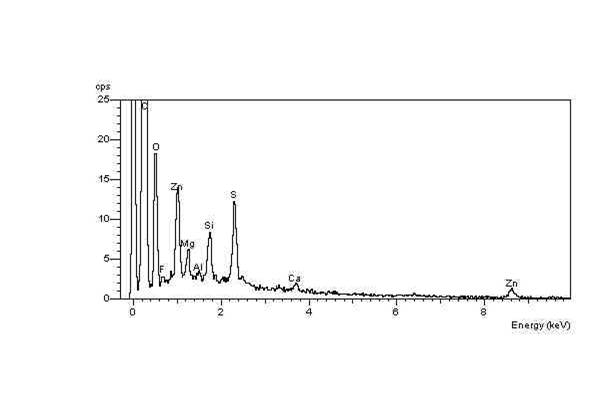
EDX spectrum of unaffected rubber surface

The carbonyl end groups which are formed are usually aldehydes or ketones, which can oxidise further to carboxylic acids. The net result is a high concentration of elemental oxygen on the crack surfaces, which can be detected using energy-dispersive X-ray spectroscopy in the environmental SEM, or ESEM. The spectrum at left shows the high oxygen peak compared with a constant sulfur peak. The spectrum at right shows the unaffected elastomer surface spectrum, with a relatively low oxygen peak compared with the sulfur peak.

== Prevention ==
The problem can be prevented by adding antiozonants to the rubber before vulcanization. Ozone cracks were commonly seen in automobile tire sidewalls, but are now seen rarely thanks to the use of these additives. A common and low cost antiozonant is a wax which bleeds to the surface and forms a protective layer, but other specialist chemicals are also widely used.

On the other hand, the problem does recur in unprotected products such as rubber tubing and seals, where ozone attack is thought to be impossible. Unfortunately, traces of ozone can turn up in the most unexpected situations. Using ozone-resistant rubbers is another way of inhibiting cracking. EPDM rubber and butyl rubber are ozone resistant, for example.

For high value equipment where loss of function can cause serious problems, low cost seals may be replaced at frequent intervals so as to preclude failure.

Ozone gas is produced during electric discharge by sparking or corona discharge for example. Static electricity can build up within machines like compressors with moving parts constructed from insulating materials. If those compressors feed pressurised air into a closed pneumatic system, then all seals in the system may be at risk from ozone cracking.

Ozone is also produced by the action of sunlight on volatile organic compounds or VOCs, such as gasoline vapour present in the air of towns and cities, in a problem known as photochemical smog. The ozone formed can drift many miles before it is destroyed by further reactions.

== See also ==
- Applied spectroscopy
- Brittleness
- Corona discharge
- Corrosion
- Electrostatic discharge
- Forensic chemistry
- Forensic engineering
- Forensic materials engineering
- Forensic polymer engineering
- Ozonolysis
- Polymer degradation
- Stress corrosion cracking
