= Styrene-butadiene =

Synthetic rubber polymer

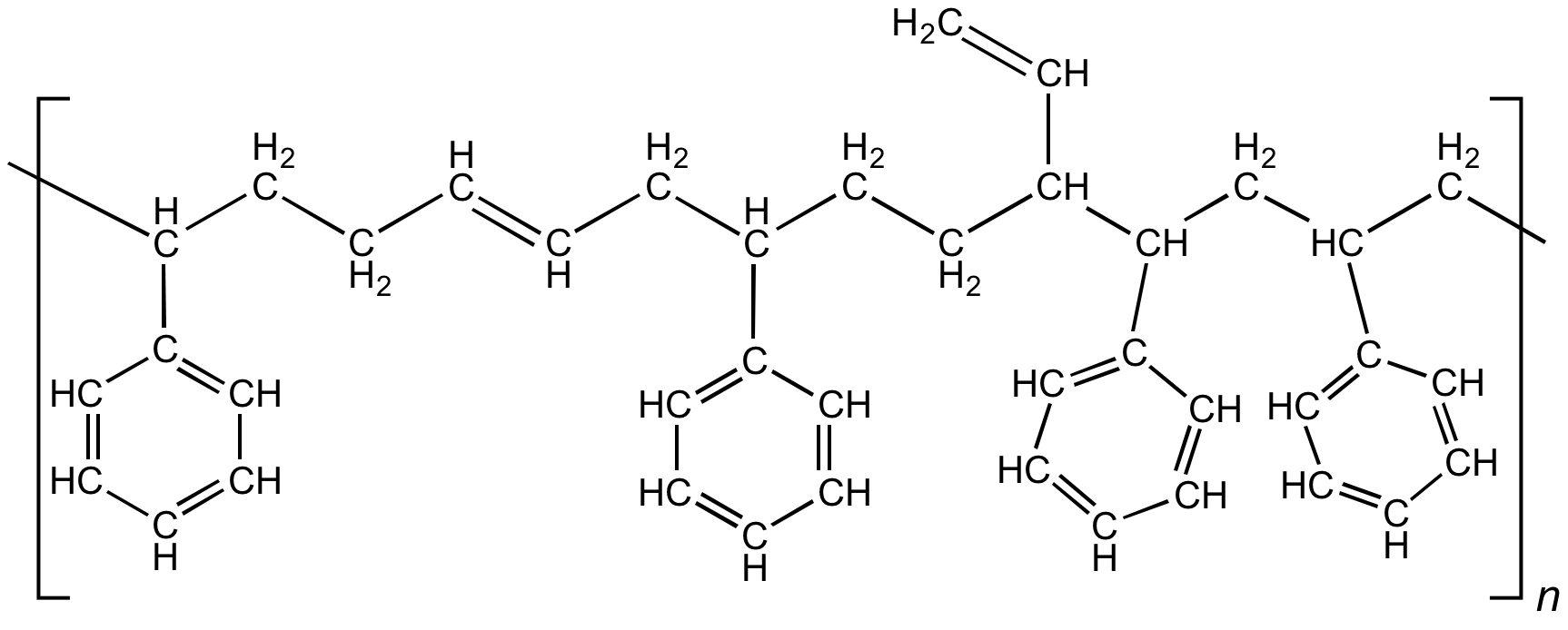

Identifiers
CAS Number	9003-55-8
ECHA InfoCard	100.127.439
EC Number	618-370-2
CompTox Dashboard (EPA)	DTXSID0049654
- Except where otherwise noted, data are given for materials in their standard state (at 25 °C [77 °F], 100 kPa). verify (what is ?) Infobox references

Styrene-butadiene or styrene-butadiene rubber (SBR) describe families of synthetic rubbers derived from styrene and butadiene (the version developed by Goodyear is called Neolite). These materials have good abrasion resistance and good aging stability when protected by additives. In 2012, more than 5.4 million tonnes of SBR were processed worldwide. About 50% of car tires are made from various types of SBR. The styrene/butadiene ratio influences the properties of the polymer: with high styrene content, the rubbers are harder and less rubbery. SBR is not to be confused with the thermoplastic elastomer, styrene-butadiene block copolymer, although being derived from the same monomers.

== Types ==
SBR is derived from two monomers, styrene and butadiene. The mixture of these two monomers is polymerized by two processes: from solution (S-SBR) or as an emulsion (E-SBR). E-SBR is more widely used.

=== Emulsion polymerization ===
E-SBR produced by emulsion polymerization is initiated by free radicals. Reaction vessels are typically charged with the two monomers, a free radical generator, and a chain transfer agent such as an alkyl mercaptan. Radical initiators include potassium persulfate and hydroperoxides in combination with ferrous salts. Emulsifying agents include various soaps. By "capping" the growing organic radicals, mercaptans (e.g. dodecylthiol), control the molecular weight of the product. Typically, polymerizations are allowed to proceed only to ca. 70%, a method called "short stopping". In this way, various additives can be removed from the polymer.

=== Solution polymerization ===
Solution-SBR is produced by an anionic polymerization process. Polymerization is initiated by alkyl lithium compounds. Water and oxygen are strictly excluded. The process is homogeneous (all components are dissolved), which provides greater control over the process, allowing tailoring of the polymer. The organolithium compound adds to one of the monomers, generating a carbanion that then adds to another monomer, and so on. For tire manufacture, S-SBR is increasingly favored because it offers improved wet grip and reduced rolling resistance, which translate to greater safety and better fuel economy, respectively.

== Buna S ==
The material was initially marketed with the brand name Buna S. Its name derives Bu for butadiene and Na for sodium (natrium in several languages including Latin, German, and Dutch), and S for styrene. Buna S is an addition copolymer.

== Properties ==
Property	S-SBR	E-SBR
Tensile strength (MPa)	36	20
Elongation at tear (%)	565	635
Mooney viscosity, 100 °C	48.0	51.6
Glass transition temperature (°C)	−65	−50
Polydispersity	2.1	4.5

== Applications ==
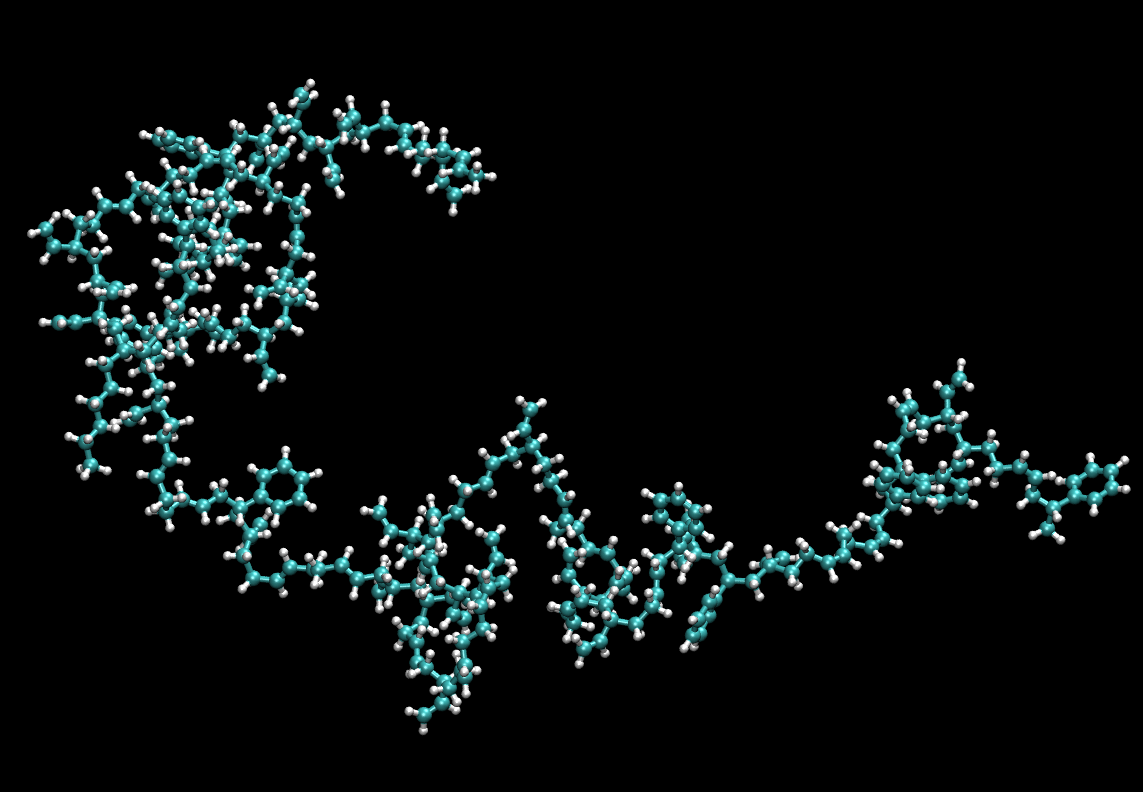
An SBR chain

Styrene-butadiene is a commodity material which competes with natural rubber. The elastomer is used widely in pneumatic tires. This application mainly calls for E-SBR, although S-SBR is growing in popularity. Other uses include shoe heels and soles, gaskets, and even chewing gum.

Latex (emulsion) SBR is extensively used in coated papers, being one of the cheapest resins to bind pigmented coatings. In 2010, more than half (54%) of all used dry binders consisted of SB-based latexes. This amounted to roughly 1.2 million metric tons (1.3 million short tons).

SBR is also used as a binder in lithium-ion battery electrodes, in combination with carboxymethyl cellulose as a water-based alternative for, e.g. polyvinylidene fluoride.

Styrene-butadiene rubber is also used in gasketed-plate heat exchangers. It is used at moderate temperature up to 85 °C (185 °F; 358 K) for aqueous systems.

== History ==
SBR is a replacement for natural rubber. It was originally developed prior to World War II in Germany by chemist Walter Bock in 1929. Industrial manufacture began during World War II, and was used extensively by the U.S. Synthetic Rubber Program to produce Government Rubber-Styrene (GR-S) to replace the Southeast Asian supply of natural rubber which, under Japanese occupation, was unavailable to Allied nations.

== See also ==
- Nitrile rubber
- Ozone cracking
- Tire
