= Nitrile rubber =

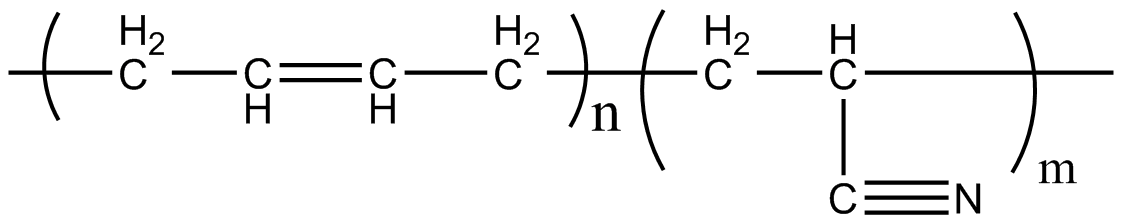

Identifiers
CAS Number	9003-18-3
ChemSpider	None
ECHA InfoCard	100.107.385
CompTox Dashboard (EPA)	DTXSID30895082
- Except where otherwise noted, data are given for materials in their standard state (at 25 °C [77 °F], 100 kPa). verify (what is ?) Infobox references

Nitrile rubber, also known as nitrile butadiene rubber, NBR, Buna-N, or acrylonitrile butadiene rubber, is a synthetic rubber derived from acrylonitrile (ACN) and butadiene. Trade names include Perbunan, Nipol, Krynac and Europrene. This rubber is unusual in being resistant to oil, fuel, and other chemicals.

NBR is used in the automotive and aeronautical industry to make fuel and oil handling hoses, seals, grommets, and self-sealing fuel tanks. It is also used in the food service, medical, and nuclear industries to make protective gloves. NBR's stability at temperatures from −40 to 108 °C (−40 to 226 °F) makes it an ideal material for aeronautical applications. Nitrile butadiene is also used to produce moulded goods, footwear, adhesives, sealants, sponges, expanded foams, and floor mats.

Its resilience makes NBR a useful material for disposable lab, cleaning, and examination gloves. Nitrile rubber is more resistant than natural rubber to oils and acids, and has superior strength, but inferior flexibility.

== History ==
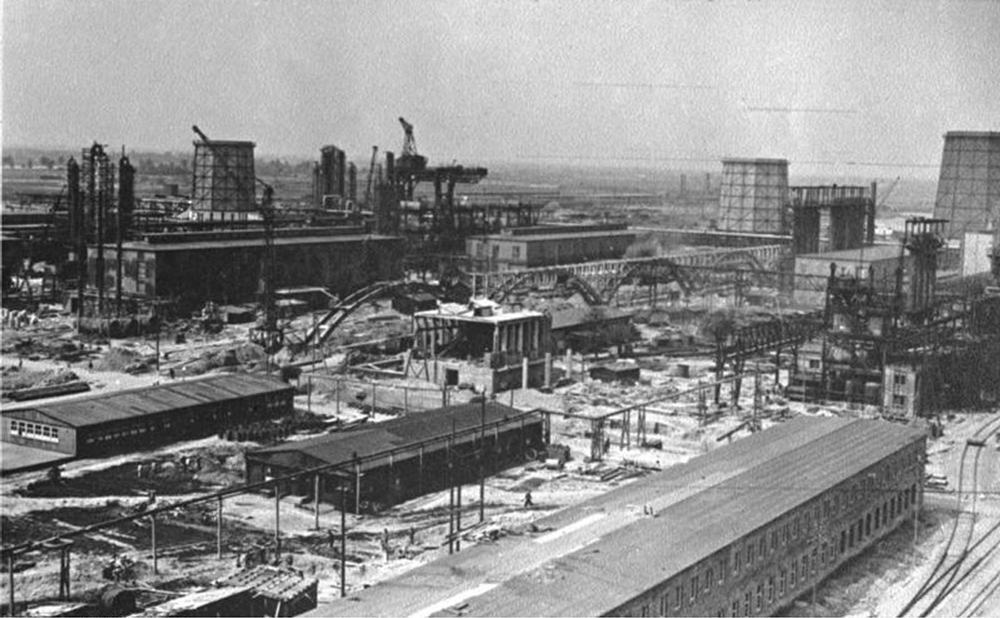
IG Farben plant under construction approximately 10 kilometres (6.2 mi) from Auschwitz, 1942.

Nitrile rubber was developed in 1931 at BASF and Bayer, then part of chemical conglomerate IG Farben. The first commercial production began in Germany in 1935.

The Buna-Werke was a slave labor factory located near concentration and extermination camps operated by Nazi Germany in occupied Poland, in Auschwitz, and financed by IG Farben. The raw materials came from the Polish coalfields. Buna rubber was named by BASF A.G., and through 1988, Buna was the remaining trade name of nitrile rubber held by BASF.

== Production ==
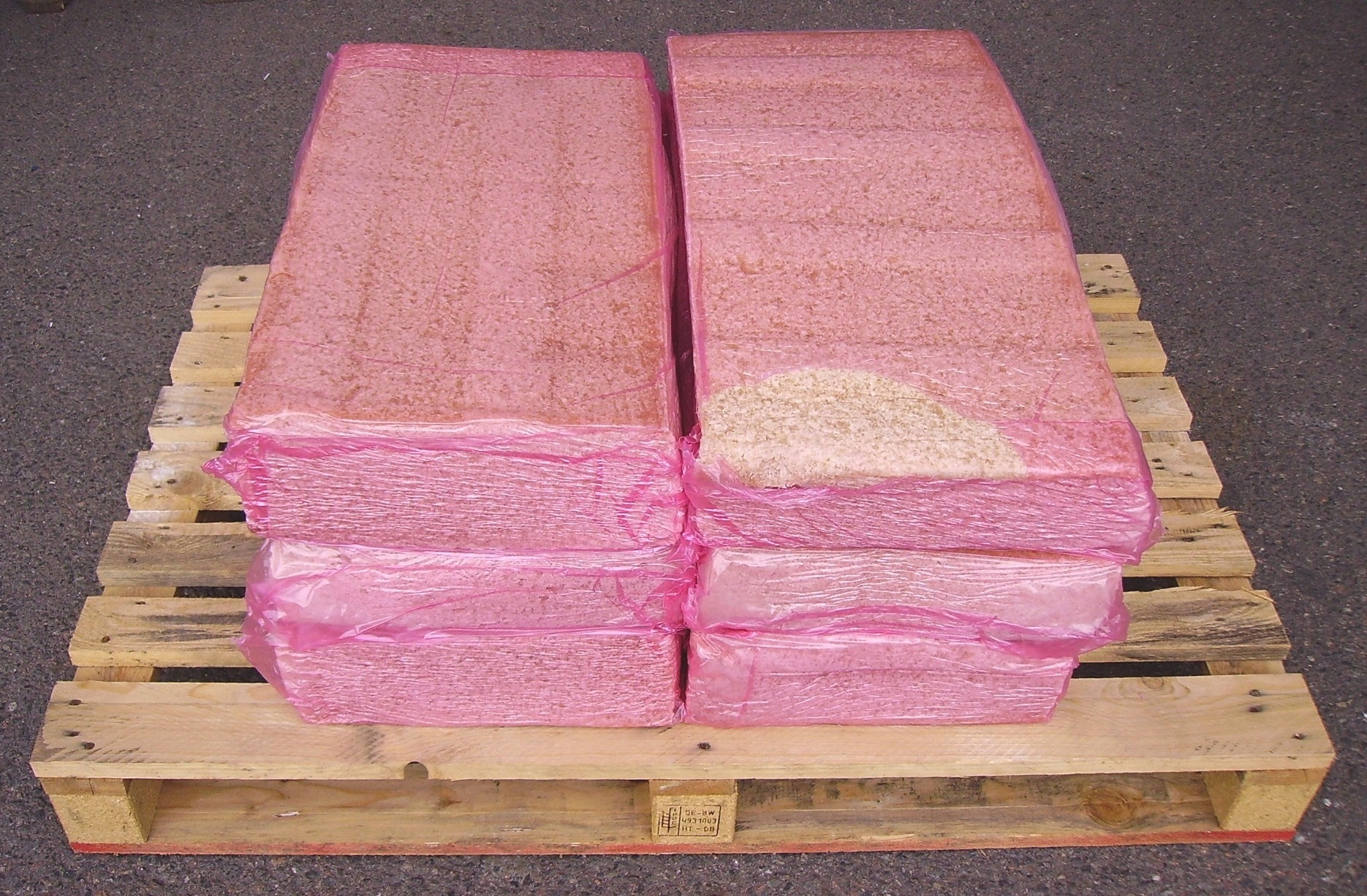
Krynac 33110 F nitrile rubber bales.

Emulsifier (soap), acrylonitrile, butadiene, radical-generating activators, and a catalyst are added to polymerization vessels in the production of hot NBR. Water serves as the reaction medium within the vessel. The tanks are heated to 30–40 °C to facilitate the polymerization reaction and to promote branch formation in the polymer. Because several monomers capable of propagating the reaction are involved in the production of nitrile rubber, the composition of each polymer can vary (depending on the concentrations of each monomer added to the polymerization tank and the conditions within the tank). There may not be a single repeating unit throughout the entire polymer. For this reason, there is also no IUPAC name for the general polymer.

Monomers are usually permitted to react for 5 to 12 hours. Polymerization is allowed to proceed to ~70% conversion before a “shortstop” agent (such as dimethyldithiocarbamate or diethylhydroxylamine) is added to react with (destroy) the remaining free radicals and initiators. Once the resultant latex has “shortstopped”, the unreacted monomers are removed through steam in a slurry stripper. Recovery of unreacted monomers is close to 100%. After monomer recovery, latex is sent through a series of filters to remove unwanted solids and then sent to the blending tanks, where it is stabilized with an antioxidant. The yielded polymer latex is coagulated using calcium nitrate, aluminium sulfate, and other coagulating agents in an aluminium tank. The coagulated substance is then washed and dried into crumb rubber.

The process for the production of cold NBR is very similar to that of hot NBR. Polymerization tanks are cooled to 5–15 °C instead of heating up to 30–40 °C, close to ambient temperature (ATC). Under lower temperature conditions, less branching will form on polymers (the amount of branching distinguishes cold NBR from hot NBR).

== Properties ==
The raw material is typically yellow, although it can also be orange or red-tinted, depending on the manufacturer. Its elongation at break is ≥ 300% and possesses a tensile strength of ≥ 10 N/mm^{2} (10 MPa). NBR has good resistance to mineral oils, vegetable oils, benzene/petrol, ordinary diluted acids, and alkalines.

An important factor in the properties of NBR is the ratio of acrylonitrile groups to butadiene groups, referred to as the ACN content. The lower the ACN content, the lower the glass transition temperature; however, the higher the ACN content, the better resistance the polymer will have to nonpolar solvents as mentioned above. Most applications requiring both solvent resistance and low-temperature flexibility require an ACN content of 33%.

Property	Value
Appearance	
Hardness, Shore A	30–90
Tensile failure stress, ultimate	500–2500 PSI
Elongation after fracture in %	600% maximum
Density	Can be compounded around 1.00 g/cm^{3}

== Applications ==
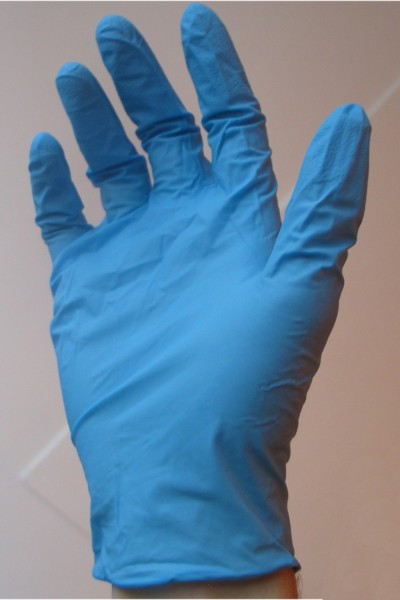
A disposable nitrile rubber glove.

The uses of nitrile rubber include disposable non-latex gloves, automotive transmission belts, hoses, O-rings, gaskets, oil seals, V-belts, synthetic leather, printer's form rollers, and as cable jacketing; NBR latex can also be used in the preparation of adhesives and as a pigment binder.

Unlike polymers meant for ingestion, where small inconsistencies in chemical composition/structure can have a pronounced effect on the body, the general properties of NBR are insensitive to composition. The production process itself is not overly complex; the polymerization, monomer recovery, and coagulation processes require some additives and equipment, but they are typical of the production of most rubbers. The necessary apparatus is simple and easy to obtain.

In January 2008, the European Commission imposed fines totaling €34,230,000 on the Bayer and Zeon groups for fixing prices for nitrile butadiene rubber, in violation of the EU ban on cartels and restrictive business practices (Article 81 of the EC Treaty and Article 53 of the EEA Agreement).

== Hydrogenated nitrile butadiene rubber (HNBR) ==
Hydrogenated nitrile butadiene rubber (HNBR) is produced by hydrogenation of NBR. Doing so removes the olefinic groups, which are vulnerable to degradation by various chemicals as well as ozone. Typically, Wilkinson's catalyst is used to promote the hydrogenation. The nitrile groups are unaffected. The degree of hydrogenation determines the kind of vulcanization that can be applied to the polymer.

Also known as highly saturated nitrile (HSN), HNBR is widely known for its physical strength and retention of properties after long-term exposure to heat, oil, and chemicals. Trade names include Zhanber (Lianda Corporation), Therban (Arlanxeo), and Zetpol (Zeon Chemical). It is commonly used to manufacture O-rings for automotive air conditioning systems. Other applications include timing belts, dampers, servo hoses, membranes, and seals.

Depending on filler selection and loading, HNBR compounds typically have tensile strengths of 20–31 MPa at 23 °C. Compounding techniques allow for HNBR to be used over a broad temperature range, −40 °C to 165 °C, with minimal degradation over long periods. For low-temperature performance, low ACN grades should be used; high-temperature performance can be obtained by using highly saturated HNBR grades with white fillers. As a group, HNBR elastomers have excellent resistance to common automotive fluids (e.g., engine oil, coolant, fuel, etc.).

The unique properties and higher temperature rating attributed to HNBR when compared to NBR have resulted in the wide adoption of HNBR in automotive, industrial, and assorted performance-demanding applications. On a volume basis, the automotive market is the largest consumer, using HNBR for a host of dynamic and static seals, hoses, and belts. HNBR has also been widely employed in industrial sealing for oil field exploration and processing, as well as rolls for steel and paper mills.

== Carboxylated nitrile butadiene rubber (XNBR) ==
An alternative version of NBR is carboxylated nitrile butadiene rubber (XNBR). XNBR is a terpolymer of butadiene, acrylonitrile, and acrylic acid. The presence of the acrylic acid introduces carboxylic acid groups (RCO_{2}H). These groups allow crosslinking through the addition of zinc (Zn^{2+}) additives. The carboxyl groups are present at levels of 10% or less. In addition to these ionic crosslinks, traditional sulfur vulcanization is applied.

== See also ==
- Acrylonitrile butadiene styrene
- Medical glove
