= 4-Oxo-TEMPO =

Names
- Systematic IUPAC name (2,2,6,6-Tetramethyl-4-oxo-1-piperidinyl)oxidanyl

Identifiers
CAS Number	2896-70-0
3D model (JSmol)	Interactive image
ChEBI	CHEBI:180665
ChEMBL	ChEMBL606972
ChemSpider	454261
EC Number	220-778-7
PubChem CID	520789
UNII	7W1863PEH5
- InChI: InChI=1S/C9H16NO2/c1-8(2)5-7(11)6-9(3,4)10(8)12/h5-6H2,1-4H3 Key: WSGDRFHJFJRSFY-UHFFFAOYSA-N
- SMILES: CC1(CC(=O)CC(N1[O])(C)C)C

Properties
Chemical formula	C_{9}H_{16}NO_{2}
Molar mass	170.232 g·mol^{−1}
Appearance	Yellowish-orange powder (needle-like crystals)
Odor	Weak, camphor-like
Melting point	36–40 °C (97–104 °F; 309–313 K)
Solubility	soluble in hexane
Dipole moment	1.36 D
- Except where otherwise noted, data are given for materials in their standard state (at 25 °C [77 °F], 100 kPa). Infobox references

4-Oxo-TEMPO or TEMPONE is a remarkably stable free radical, related to the more well-known compounds 4-hydroxy-TEMPO and TEMPO.

== Synthesis ==
4-Oxo-TEMPO was first prepared by Lebedev and co-workers in 1961, via the condensation of phorone with ammonia in alkaline aqueous solution at 100 °C, producing a triacetonamine-containing mixture, followed immediately by oxidation with hydrogen peroxide and sodium tungstate in the presence of tetrasodium EDTA at 50 °C.

It is also possible to use the same reagents to directly oxidize triacetonamine at room temperature, which yields a much easier-to-purify product.

== Properties ==
It is a yellowish-orange solid; it is storable for several months in solid form at temperatures of around -20 °C.

It dissolves in water and other polar solvents to form yellow solutions, and in ether, ethanol, and benzene to form ruby-red solutions.

It forms a series of adducts with n-alkanes from heptane onwards, each of which has a well-defined melting point, unlike the corresponding adducts formed by urea with n-alkanes.

Their formation is perhaps attributable to the twist-boat conformation adopted by 4-oxo-TEMPO, which differs from related aminoxyls, for example, 4-hydroxy-TEMPO, which adopts a boat confirmation.

== Applications ==
4-Oxo-TEMPO has been used to investigate the generation of singlet oxygen by photoexcited titanium dioxide in ethanol by ESR spectroscopy. It can be used as a catalyst in various reactions. It can also be used as a polarizing agent in dynamic nuclear polarization NMR spectroscopy.

It may be used as a free radical scavenger.
