= C9H14O =

The molecular formula C_{9}H_{14}O may refer to:

- Isophorone (α-isophorone)
- β-Isophorone
- trans,cis-2,6-Nonadienal
- Phorone
