= Babler oxidation =

Chemical reaction

The Babler oxidation, also known as the Babler–Dauben oxidation, is an organic reaction for the oxidative transposition of tertiary allylic alcohols to enones using pyridinium chlorochromate (PCC):

Line reaction for Babler oxidation of tertiary allylic alcohols

It is named after James Babler who first reported the reaction in 1976 and William Dauben who extended the scope to cyclic systems in 1977, thereby significantly increasing the synthetic utility:

Babler–Dauben oxidation of cyclic tertiary allylic alcohols

The reaction produces the desired enone product to high yield (typically >75%), is operationally simple and does not require air-free techniques or heating. It suffers, however, from the very high toxicity and environmental hazard posed by the hexavalent chromium PCC oxidising reagent.

The solvent of choice is usually dry dichloromethane (DCM) or chloroform (CHCl_{3}).

The reaction has been utilised as a step in the total syntheses of various compounds, e.g. of morphine.

== Mechanism ==
Babler oxidation mechanism

The reaction proceeds through the formation of a chromate ester (1) from nucleophilic attack of the chlorochromate by the allylic alcohol. The ester then undergoes a [3,3]-sigmatropic shift to create the isomeric chromate ester (2). Finally, oxidation of this intermediate yields the α,β-unsaturated aldehyde or ketone product (3).

== Alternative reagents ==
Concerns about the high toxicity and carcinogenicity of the PCC oxidant, as well as the role of chromium(VI) species as environmental pollutants in groundwater, have led to investigations for the replacement of PCC in the reaction. One successful alternative reported by multiple sources involves the use of N-oxoammonium salts derived from TMP:

Babler–Dauben oxidation of tertiary alcohols using oxoammonium salt oxidiser

The oxoammonium salts with non-coordinating anions are used (such as tetrafluoroborate, perchlorate, hexafluorophosphate or hexafluoroantimonate). The oxidiser is added in stoichiometric amounts, usually 1.5 eq of alcohol.

A different approach to minimise toxic chromium(VI) use involves performing the reaction with only a catalytic amount of PCC and an excess of another oxidant, to re-oxidise the chromium species as part of the catalytic cycle. Commonly reported stoichiometric reagents for this purpose include di-tert-butyl peroxide, 2-iodoxybenzoic acid or periodates.

== Secondary alcohols ==
The Babler–Dauben oxidation of secondary allylic alcohols proves more difficult to control than that of tertiary analogues, as along with the desired product (a) a mixture with high proportion of side-products (b) and (c) is obtained:

Babler–Dauben oxidation of secondary alcohols and side-products

The yield of a is found to be maximised when PCC is not used in stoichiometric quantities but as a co-oxidant; the best effect (50–70% yield of a) is achieved for orthoperiodic acid as the main oxidiser with a 5% molar PCC. Acetonitrile (MeCN) over the usual DCM is used as the solvent.

Notably, in contrast to the general oxidation of tertiary alcohols, the secondary alcohol case only works with aromatic substrates (Ar-: an aryl group). This, along with the strongly acidic conditions due to the stoichiometric amount of periodic acid, suggest that the initially formed chromate ester isomerises through a carbocationic route rather than a sigmatotropic reaction as for tertiary alcohols.

== See also ==
- Oxidation with chromium(VI) complexes
- Oxoammonium-catalyzed oxidation
- Other reactions of PCC
