= Bis(2,2,6,6-tetramethyl-4-piperidyl) sebacate =

Antioxidant stabilizers for plastics and polymers

BTMPS

Names
- Other names Trade names: Tinuvin 770 (BASF); Lowilite 77 (SI Group); ADK STAB LA-77 (Adeka)

Identifiers
CAS Number	52829-07-9
3D model (JSmol)	Interactive image
ChemSpider	144046
ECHA InfoCard	100.052.899
EC Number	258-207-9
MeSH	C083752
PubChem CID	164282
UNII	6803A71201
CompTox Dashboard (EPA)	DTXSID0028030
- InChI: InChI=1S/C28H52N2O4/c1-25(2)17-21(18-26(3,4)29-25)33-23(31)15-13-11-9-10-12-14-16-24(32)34-22-19-27(5,6)30-28(7,8)20-22/h21-22,29-30H,9-20H2,1-8H3 Key: XITRBUPOXXBIJN-UHFFFAOYSA-N
- SMILES: CC1(C)CC(CC(C)(C)N1)OC(=O)CCCCCCCCC(=O)OC2CC(C)(C)NC(C)(C)C2

Properties
Chemical formula	C_{28}H_{52}N_{2}O_{4}
Molar mass	480.734 g·mol^{−1}
Appearance	white powder (aminoxyl form is orange-red)
Density	1.05 g/cm^{3}
Melting point	81 to 85 °C (178 to 185 °F; 354 to 358 K)
- Except where otherwise noted, data are given for materials in their standard state (at 25 °C [77 °F], 100 kPa). Infobox references

Bis(2,2,6,6-tetramethyl-4-piperidyl) sebacate (abbreviated BTMPS) is a hindered amine light stabilizer used to protect plastics and coatings such as paint from oxidation caused by sunlight weathering. Like most compounds of this class, the activated form is an aminoxyl radical.

== Synthesis ==
It is produced by the diesterification of sebacic acid (decanedioic acid) with 4-hydroxy-TEMPO.

== Public health and medical concerns ==
In 2024, it was detected as an adulterant in illicitly sold fentanyl in the United States. It is capable of inhibiting nicotinic acetylcholine receptors. Additionally, it is a potent blocker of L-type calcium channels. It is also able to induce dose-dependent hemodynamic alterations. Similar to early calcium channel blockers, it can precipitate adrenergic release.

== See also ==
- Antioxidant
- Photolysis (photodegradation)
- Radical (chemistry)
