= 4-Amino-2,2,6,6-tetramethylpiperidine =

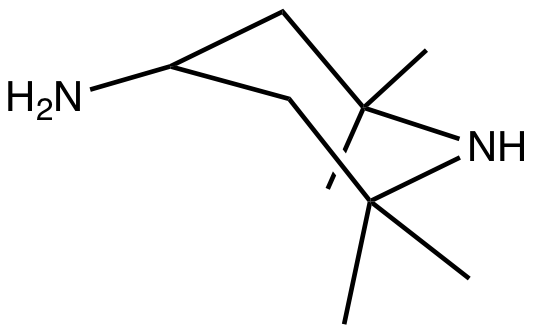

Names
- Preferred IUPAC name 2,2,6,6-Tetramethylpiperidin-4-amine
- Other names 2,2,6,6-Tetramethyl-4-aminopiperidine

Identifiers
CAS Number	36768-62-4
3D model (JSmol)	Interactive image
ChEMBL	ChEMBL368366
ChemSpider	34423
ECHA InfoCard	100.048.345
EC Number	253-197-2
PubChem CID	37524
UNII	ETF220Q65R
CompTox Dashboard (EPA)	DTXSID3044388
- InChI: InChI=1S/C9H20N2/c1-8(2)5-7(10)6-9(3,4)11-8/h7,11H,5-6,10H2,1-4H3 Key: FTVFPPFZRRKJIH-UHFFFAOYSA-N
- SMILES: CC1(CC(CC(N1)(C)C)N)C

Properties
Chemical formula	C_{9}H_{20}N_{2}
Molar mass	156.273 g·mol^{−1}
Appearance	Colorless liquid
Density	0.8966 g/cm^{3}
Melting point	17 °C (63 °F; 290 K)
Boiling point	188.5 °C (371.3 °F; 461.6 K)

Hazards
- GHS labelling
Pictograms	(GHS05: Corrosive) (GHS07: Exclamation mark)
Signal word	Danger
Hazard statements	H290, H302, H314, H412
Precautionary statements	P234, P260, P264, P270, P273, P280, P301+P312, P301+P330+P331, P303+P361+P353, P304+P340, P305+P351+P338, P310, P321, P330, P363, P390, P404, P405, P501
- Except where otherwise noted, data are given for materials in their standard state (at 25 °C [77 °F], 100 kPa). Infobox references

4-Amino-2,2,6,6-tetramethyl-4-piperidine is an organic compound with the formula H_{2}NCH(CH_{2}CMe_{2})_{2}NH (where Me = CH_{3}). Classified as a diamine, it is a colorless oily liquid.

The compound is an intermediate in the preparation of Bobbitt's salt, an oxidant used in organic synthesis. It is prepared by the reductive amination of the corresponding ketone:

OC(CH_{2}CMe_{2})_{2}NH + NH_{3} + H_{2} → H_{2}NCH(CH_{2}CMe_{2})_{2}NH + H_{2}O

== Compound Properties ==
Boiling point is 188.5 °C. Melting point is 17 °C. Density is 0.8966 g/cm3 @ Temp: 20 °C.

== Toxicity ==
A study by Truda et al, has reported the median lethal dose (LD_{50}) as 906 mg/kg in rats.

== Related compounds ==
- Pempidine
- 2,2,6,6-Tetramethylpiperidine
