= 4-Acetamido-TEMPO =

Names
- Preferred IUPAC name (4-Acetamido-2,2,6,6-tetramethylpiperidin-1-yl)oxyl

Identifiers
CAS Number	14691-89-5
3D model (JSmol)	Interactive image
ChEBI	CHEBI:180673
ChemSpider	452722
ECHA InfoCard	100.102.239
PubChem CID	518988
UNII	G7ABJ73L6S
CompTox Dashboard (EPA)	DTXSID60932959
- InChI: InChI=1S/C11H21N2O2/c1-8(14)12-9-6-10(2,3)13(15)11(4,5)7-9/h9H,6-7H2,1-5H3,(H,12,14) Key: UXBLSWOMIHTQPH-UHFFFAOYSA-N
- SMILES: CC(=O)NC1CC(N(C(C1)(C)C)[O])(C)C

Properties
Chemical formula	C_{11}H_{21}N_{2}O_{2}
Molar mass	213.30 g·mol^{−1}
Appearance	orange solid
- Except where otherwise noted, data are given for materials in their standard state (at 25 °C [77 °F], 100 kPa). Infobox references

4-acetamido-TEMPO (short for (4-acetamido-2,2,6,6-tetramethylpiperidin-1-yl)oxyl) is a stable radical used for oxidation reactions in organic chemistry. It is a derivative of TEMPO, from which it differs by the additional acetamide group.

== Preparation ==
4-acetamido-TEMPO can be prepared from 4-amino-2,2,6,6-tetramethylpiperidine. By reaction with acetic anhydride, the amino group is acetylated, and an acetate salt is formed. The free base can be regenerated with potassium carbonate. Oxidation to the nitroxyl radical occurs with hydrogen peroxide in the presence of sodium tungstate and ethylenediaminetetraacetic acid.

== Properties ==
4-acetamido-TEMPO is a stable radical and exists as a crystalline, orange-colored solid.

== Reactions ==
4-acetamido-TEMPO is suitable as a catalyst for oxidation reactions. This includes the oxidation of primary amines to nitriles with potassium peroxymonosulfate as the stoichiometric oxidizing agent. Additionally, it can be used to oxidize alcohols to aldehydes and ketones. A closely related reagent is the Bobbitt's salt, an oxidized derivative of 4-acetamido-TEMPO. The Bobbitt salt can be prepared starting from 4-acetamido-TEMPO by reacting it first with tetrafluoroboric acid and then with sodium hypochlorite.
