= Stabilizer (chemistry) =

Chemical used to prevent degradation

In industrial chemistry, a stabilizer or stabiliser is a chemical that is used to prevent degradation. Above all, heat and light stabilizers are added to plastic and rubber materials because they ensure safe processing and protect products against aging and weathering. In particular polyvinyl chloride would not be possible without stabilizers (PVC is one of the most important plastics and used for pipes, window frames and many other products).

In economic terms the most important product groups on the market for stabilizers are compounds based on calcium (calcium-zinc and organo-calcium), lead, and tin stabilizers as well as liquid and light stabilizers (HALS, benzophenone, benzotriazole). Cadmium-based stabilizers largely vanished in the last years due to health and environmental concerns. In 2023, almost half of all polymer stabilizers sold worldwide were based on calcium.

== Polymers (plastics and elastomers) ==
Stabilizing additives for plastics are produced in different forms. The trend is towards fluid systems, pellets, and increased use of masterbatches. There are monofunctional, bifunctional, and polyfunctional stabilizers. Some kinds of stabilizers are:

- antioxidants these prevent autoxidation of materials and come in 3 primary forms.
  - Oxygen scavengers (primarily phosphite esters such as tris(2,4-di-tert-butylphenyl)phosphite) are commonly used during the initial processing of the plastic.
  - Persistent radical scavengers prevent or slow the photo-oxidation of polymers. Traditionally these are alkylated phenols such as butylated hydroxytoluene but now also include hindered amine light stabilizers (HALS)
  - Antiozonants prevents or retards the degradation of polymers caused by ozone (ozone cracking)
- sequestrants, forming chelate complexes and inactivating traces of metal ions that would otherwise act as catalysts
- ultraviolet stabilizers are used to protect polymers from effects of ultraviolet radiation and come to 2 main types.
  - UV absorbers which essentially act the same way as sunscreens
  - Quenchers, which dissipate the radiation energy as heat instead of letting it break chemical bonds; often organic nickel salts, e.g. nickel phenolates

== Paints ==
- emulsifiers and surfactants, for stabilization of emulsions

== Food ==
In foods, stabilizers prevent spoilage. Classes of food stabilizers include emulsifiers, thickeners and gelling agents, foam stabilizers, humectants, anticaking agents, and coating agents.

Representative stabilizers

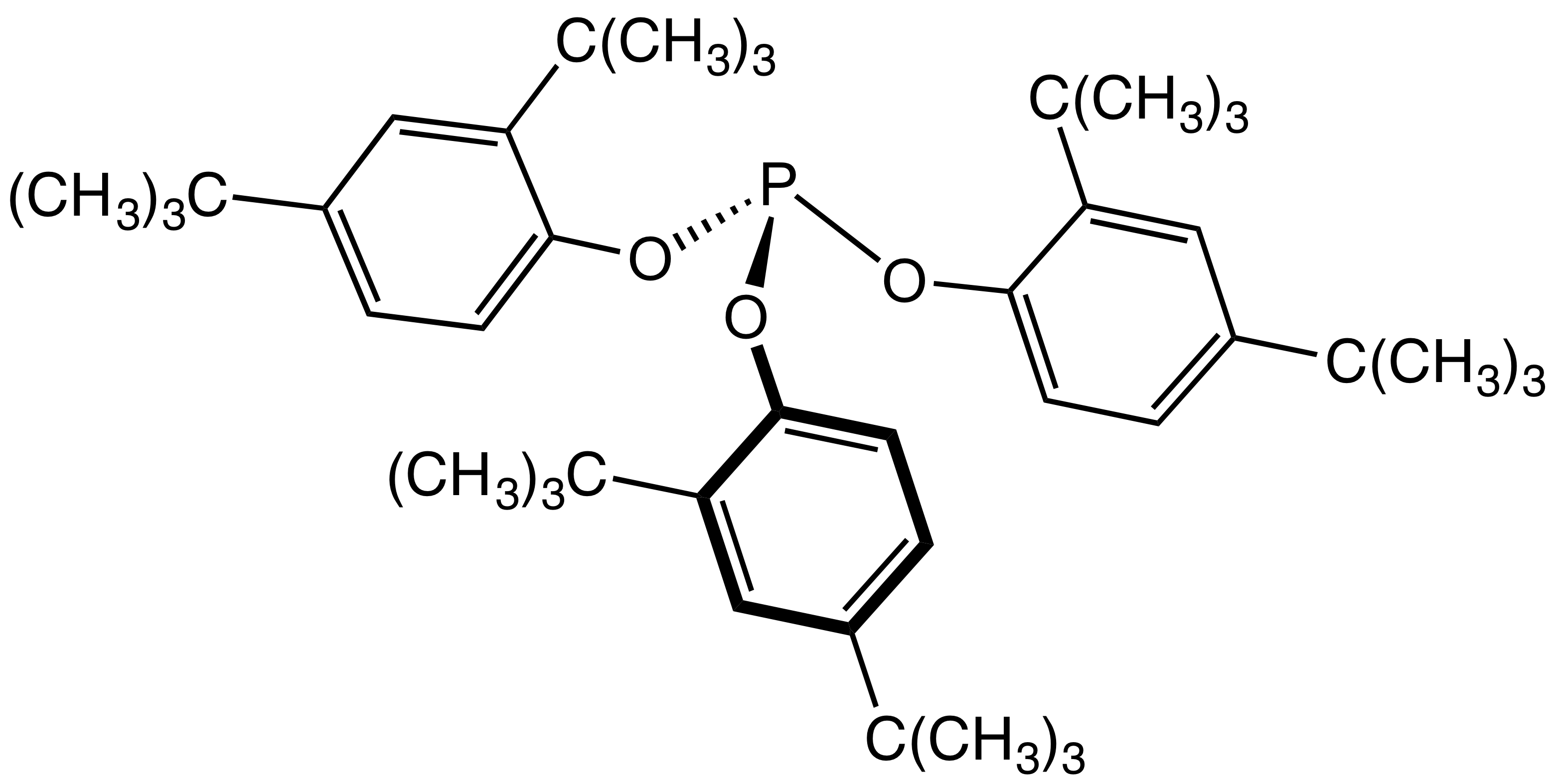
Tris(2,4-di-tert-butylphenyl)phosphite is a widely used stabilizer in polymers.

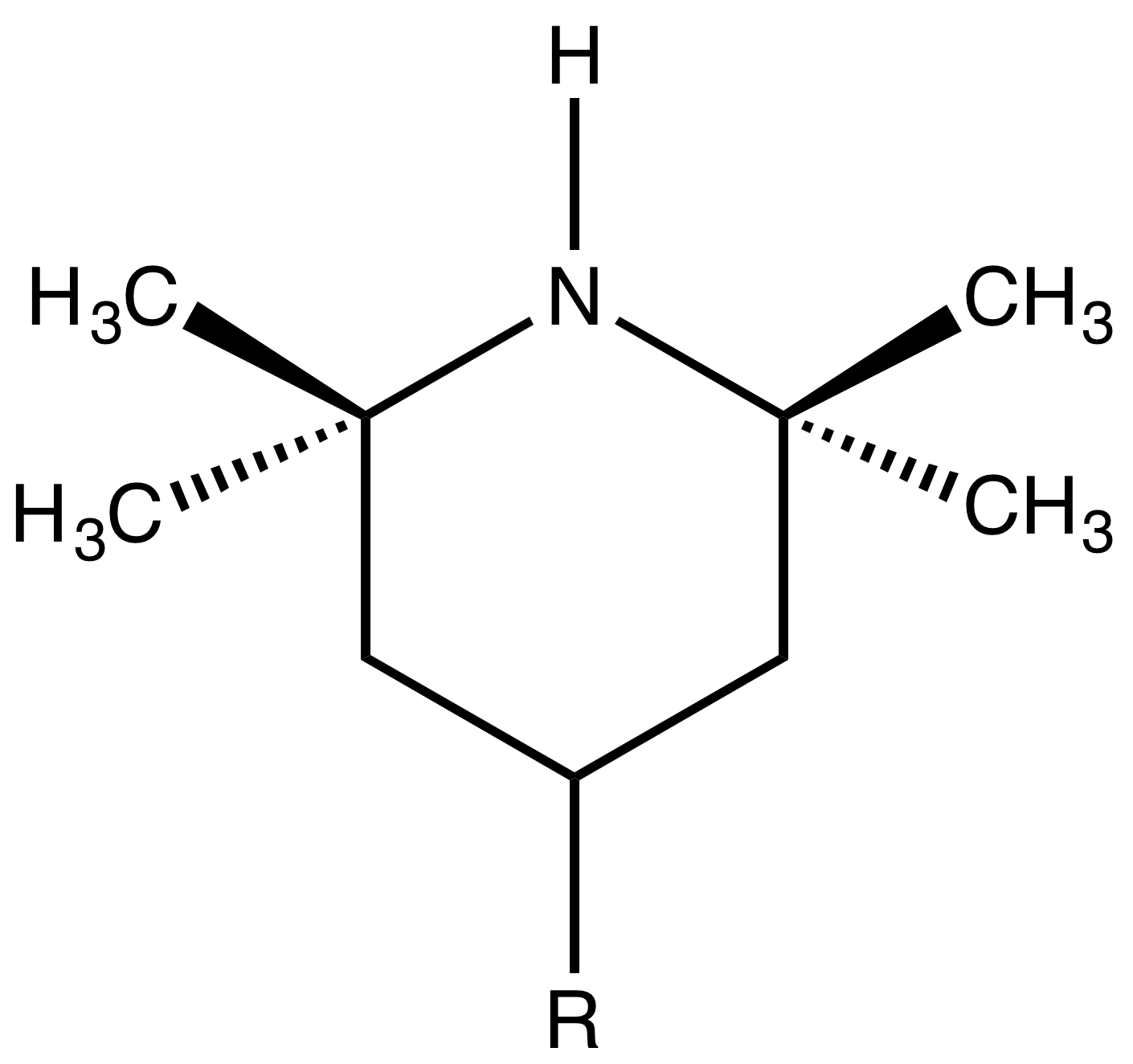
Partial structure of typical hindered amine light stabilizers, widely used to protect automotive paints from degradation by UV-light.

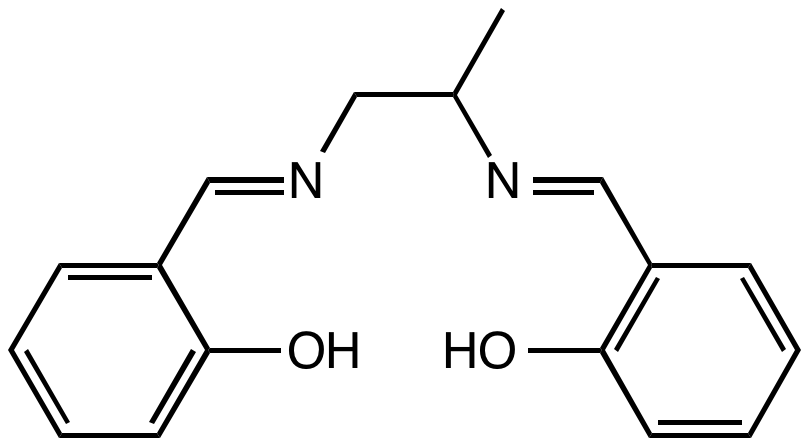
Salpn is a typical metal deactivator used as a fuel additive to suppress oxidation processes that lead to gums and solids. Metal deactivators like salpn form stable complexes with the metals, suppressing their catalytic activity.

== See also ==
- Corrosion inhibitor
- Stabilizers for polymers
