= 4-Hydroxy-TEMPO =

Heterocyclic compound bearing a stable aminoxyl radical

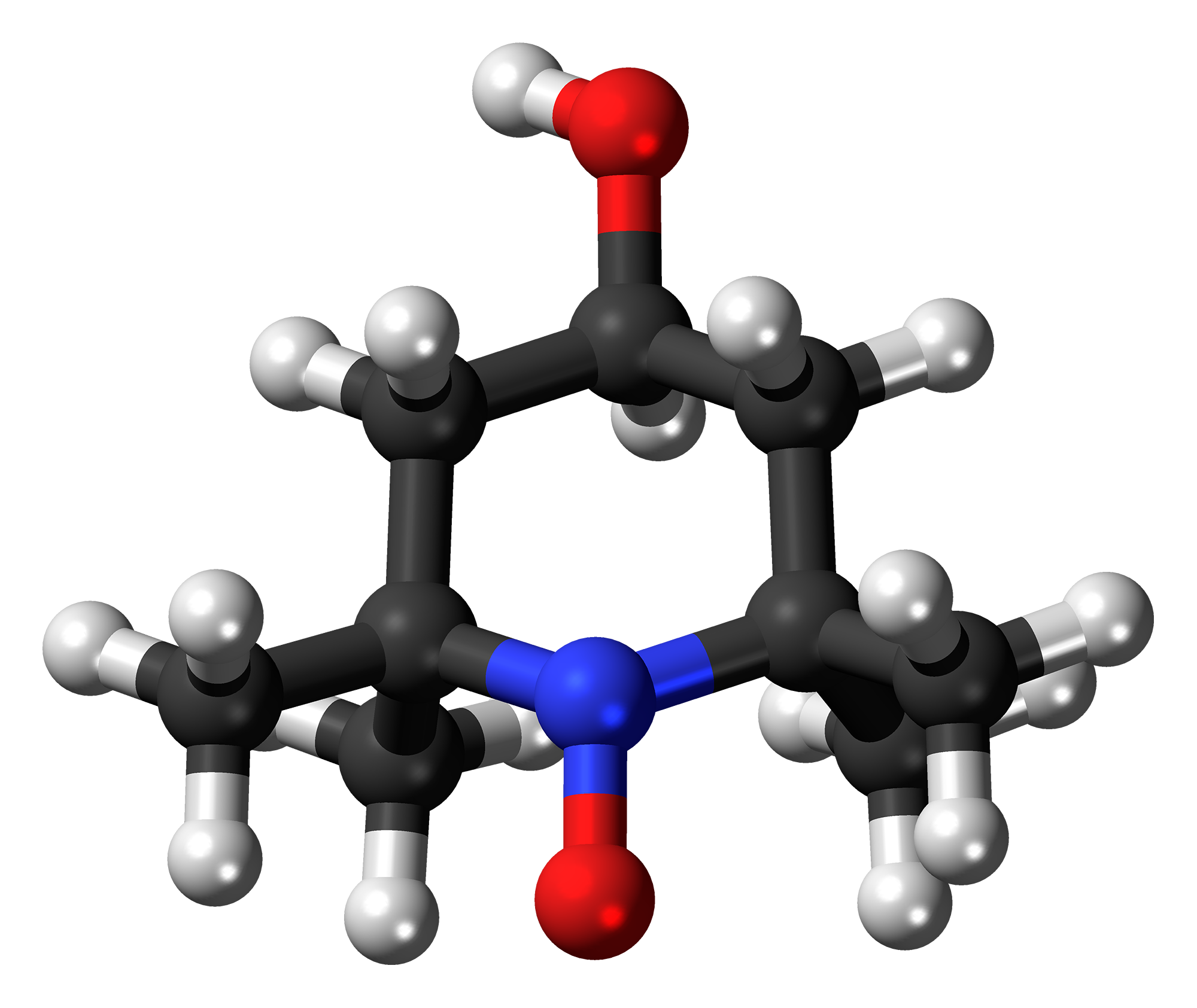

Names
- Preferred IUPAC name (4-Hydroxy-2,2,6,6-tetramethylpiperidin-1-yl)oxyl
- Other names tempol; tanol; TMPN; 4-Oxypiperidol; nitroxyl 2; HyTEMPO

Identifiers
CAS Number	2226-96-2
3D model (JSmol)	Interactive image
ChEBI	CHEBI:180664
ChEMBL	ChEMBL607023
ChemSpider	121639
ECHA InfoCard	100.017.056
PubChem CID	137994
UNII	U78ZX2F65X
CompTox Dashboard (EPA)	DTXSID4041280
- InChI: InChI=1S/C9H18NO2/c1-8(2)5-7(11)6-9(3,4)10(8)12/h7,11H,5-6H2,1-4H3 Key: UZFMOKQJFYMBGY-UHFFFAOYSA-N; InChI=1S/C9H18NO2/c1-8(2)5-7(11)6-9(3,4)10(8)12/h7,11H,5-6H2,1-4H3 Key: UZFMOKQJFYMBGY-UHFFFAOYSA-N
- SMILES: CC1(C)CC(O)CC(C)(C)N1[O]

Properties
Chemical formula	C_{9}H_{18}NO_{2}
Molar mass	172.248 g·mol^{−1}
Appearance	Orange crystals
Melting point	71–73 °C (160–163 °F; 344–346 K)
Solubility in water	629.3 g/L (20 °C)

Hazards
- GHS labelling
Pictograms	(GHS07: Exclamation mark)
Signal word	Warning
Hazard statements	H302, H315, H319, H335
Precautionary statements	P261, P305+P351+P338
- Except where otherwise noted, data are given for materials in their standard state (at 25 °C [77 °F], 100 kPa). verify (what is ?) Infobox references

4-Hydroxy-TEMPO or TEMPOL, formally 4-hydroxy-2,2,6,6-tetramethylpiperidin-1-oxyl, is a heterocyclic compound. Like the related TEMPO, it is used as a catalyst and chemical oxidant by virtue of being a stable aminoxyl radical. Its major appeal over TEMPO is that it is less expensive, being produced from triacetone amine, which is itself made via the condensation of acetone and ammonia. This makes it economically viable on an industrial scale.

Example synthesis of 4-Hydroxy-TEMPO from phorone, which is itself made from acetone and ammonia

In biochemical research, 4-hydroxy-TEMPO has been investigated as an agent for limiting reactive oxygen species. It catalyzes the disproportionation of superoxide, facilitates hydrogen peroxide metabolism, and inhibits Fenton chemistry. 4-Hydroxy-TEMPO, along with related nitroxides, are being studied for their potential antioxidant properties.

On an industrial-scale 4-hydroxy-TEMPO is often present as a structural element in hindered amine light stabilizers, which are commonly used stabilizers in plastics, it is also used as a polymerisation inhibitor, particularly during the purification of styrene.

It is a promising model substance to inhibit SARS-CoV-2 RNA-dependent RNA polymerase.

== See also ==
- Bobbitt's salt
- pH neutral aqueous organic flow batteries
