= C10H21N =

The molecular formula C_{10}H_{21}N (molar mass: 155.28 g/mol, exact mass: 155.1674 u) may refer to:

- Levopropylhexedrine (Eventin)
- Pempidine
- Propylhexedrine (Benzedrex)
