= Imine N-oxide =

An imine N-oxide may refer to:

- An oxime (>C=NOH)
- A nitrone (>C=N(O)-)
