= C8H5NO3 =

The molecular formula C_{8}H_{5}NO_{3} (molar mass: 163.13 g/mol, exact mass: 163.0269 u) may refer to:

- N-Hydroxyphthalimide
- Isatoic anhydride
