= Bobbitt reaction =

Chemical reaction

Named after	James M. Bobbitt
Reaction type	Ring forming reaction

The Bobbitt reaction is a name reaction in organic chemistry. It is named after the American chemist James M. Bobbitt. The reaction allows the synthesis of 1-, 4-, and N-substituted 1,2,3,4-tetrahydroisoquinolines and also 1-, and 4-substituted isoquinolines.

== General Reaction Scheme ==
The reaction scheme below shows the synthesis of 1,2,3,4-tetrahydroisoquinoline from benzaldehyde and 2,2-diethylethylamine.

Bobbitt reaction (general reaction scheme)

== Reaction Mechanism ==
A possible mechanism is depicted below:

proposed mechanism Bobbitt reaction

First the benzaliminoacetal 3 is built by the condensation of benzaldehyde 1 and 2,2-diethylethylamine 2. After the condensation the C=N-double bond in 3 is hydrogenated to form 4. Subsequently, an ethanol is removed. Next, the compound 5 is built including the cyclization step. After that the C=C-double bond in 5 is hydrogenated . Thus, 1,2,3,4-tetrahydroisoquinoline 6 is formed.

== Applications ==
The Bobbitt reaction has found application in the preparation of some alkaloids such as carnegine, lophocerine, salsolidine, and salsoline.

== See also ==
- Pomeranz–Fritsch reaction
