= 1-Hydroxy-2,2,6,6-tetramethylpiperidine =

Organic compound

Names
- Preferred IUPAC name 2,2,6,6-Tetramethylpiperidin-1-ol
- Other names: TEMPOH; 2,2,6,6-Tetramethyl-1-hydroxypiperidine

Identifiers
CAS Number	7031-93-8
3D model (JSmol)	Interactive image
Beilstein Reference	1422418
ChEMBL	ChEMBL117747
ChemSpider	478474
PubChem CID	549976
UNII	V7P47JWA4V
CompTox Dashboard (EPA)	DTXSID60338578
- InChI: InChI=1S/C9H19NO/c1-8(2)6-5-7-9(3,4)10(8)11/h11H,5-7H2,1-4H3 Key: VUZNLSBZRVZGIK-UHFFFAOYSA-N
- SMILES: CC1(CCCC(N1O)(C)C)C

Properties
Chemical formula	C_{9}H_{19}NO
Molar mass	157.257 g·mol^{−1}
Appearance	white solid
Melting point	39–40 °C (102–104 °F; 312–313 K)
- Except where otherwise noted, data are given for materials in their standard state (at 25 °C [77 °F], 100 kPa). Infobox references

1-Hydroxy-2,2,6,6-tetramethylpiperidine is the organic compound with the formula C_{5}H_{6}Me_{4}NOH (Me = CH_{3}). A white solid, it is classified as a hydroxylamine. The compound has attracted interest as the reduced derivative of the popular radical 2,2,6,6-tetramethylpiperidin-1-yl)oxyl ("TEMPO"). It is a mild base.
