= Polymerisation inhibitor =

Substances which prevent monomers from self-polymerizing

In polymer chemistry, polymerisation inhibitors (US: polymerization inhibitors) are chemical compounds added to monomers to prevent their self-polymerisation. Unsaturated monomers such as acrylates, vinyl chloride, butadiene and styrene require inhibitors for both processing and safe transport and storage. Many monomers are purified industrially by distillation, which can lead to thermally-initiated polymerisation. Styrene, for example, is distilled at temperatures above 100 °C whereupon it undergoes thermal polymerisation at a rate of ~2% per hour. This polymerisation is undesirable, as it can foul the fractionating tower; it is also typically exothermic, which can lead to a runaway reaction and potential explosion if left unchecked. Once initiated, polymerisation is typically radical in mechanism and as such many polymerisation inhibitors act as radical scavengers.

== Inhibitors vs retarders ==
The term 'inhibitor' is often used in a general sense to describe any compound used to prevent unwanted polymerisation, however these compounds are often divided into 'retarders' and 'true inhibitors'. A true inhibitor has a well defined induction period during which no noticeable polymerisation takes place. They are consumed during this period and once gone polymerisation occurs as normal. Retarders display no induction period but provide a permanent decrease in the rate of polymerisation, while themselves being degraded only slowly. Attempts have been made to define the difference quantitatively in terms of reaction rate. In an industrial setting compounds from both classes will usually be used together, with the true inhibitor providing optimal plant performance and the retarder acting as a failsafe.

== Inhibitors for processing ==
=== True inhibitors ===
Radical polymerisation of unsaturated monomers is generally propagated by radicals located on carbon atoms. These can be effectively terminated by combining them with other radicals to form neutral species (chain termination). Most true inhibitors operate through this mechanism. In the simplest example, oxygen can be used as it exists naturally in its triplet state (i.e. it is a diradical). This is referred to as air-inhibition or oxygen-inhibition, it is a diffusion-controlled reaction with rates typically in the order of 10^{7}–10^{9} mol^{−1} s^{−1}, the resulting peroxy radicals (ROO•) are less reactive towards polymerisation. Oxygen can also be necessary to activate or regenerate certain types of inhibitors such as p-phenylenediamines, and hydroxylamines like HPHA and DEHA, which are thought to react through the intermediary of aminoxyl radicals.

Air stabilisation is not suitable for monomers with which it can form explosive organic peroxides; such as vinyl chloride and acrylates. For these other stable radicals must be used, examples include TEMPO, TEMPOL, and phenothiazine which are exceedingly effective radical scavengers. Not all inhibitors are radicals, with quinones and quinone methides being important examples.

=== Retarders ===
Certain hydroxylamines and p-phenylenediamine may act as retarders. For styrene, nitrophenol compounds such as dinitro-ortho-cresol and di-nitro-sec-butylphenol (DNBP or Dinoseb) have long been used but are highly toxic and polluting.

== Inhibitors for transport & storage ==
Purified monomers stored at ambient temperatures are of less risk of polymerising and as such the most highly reactive inhibitors are rarely used at this stage. In general compounds are chosen which can be easily removed immediately prior to industrial polymerisation to make plastics. Compounds bearing a hydroxy group, which can be removed by an alkali wash, tend to dominate. Examples include 4-tert-butylcatechol (TBC), 4-methoxyphenol (MEHQ), butylated hydroxytoluene (BHT), and hydroquinone (HQ).

== See also ==
- Anti-skinning agent - These agents prevent polymerisation in paints and varnishes by binding to, and thus inhibiting, the action of oil drying agents
- Tubulin polymerisation inhibitors - chemotherapy drugs that interfere with the tubulin system
