= Aminoxyl group =

Aminoxyl denotes a radical functional group with general structure R_{2}N–O^{•}. It is commonly known as a nitroxyl radical or a nitroxide, however IUPAC discourages the use of these terms, as they erroneously suggest the presence of a nitro group. Aminoxyls are structurally related to hydroxylamines and N-oxoammonium salts, with which they can interconvert via a series of redox steps.

The general structure of the aminoxyl radical

TEMPO, a commonly encountered organic aminoxyl radical

Fremy's salt, an inorganic aminoxyl radical

Sterically unhindered aminoxyls bearing α-hydrogens are unstable and undergo rapid disproportionation to nitrones and hydroxylamines. Sterically hindered aminoxyls without α-hydrogens, such TEMPO and TEMPOL, are persistent (stable) radicals and find use in a range of applications, both on the laboratory scale and in industry. Their ability to reversibly bind to other radical compounds makes them important as both spin labels and spin traps. They are used to selectively oxidise carbonyl groups via oxoammonium-catalyzed oxidations. They are also used as polymer stabilizers such as hindered amine light stabilizers or as transient reactive species in p-phenylenediamine based antiozonants. They are used both to form polymers via nitroxide-mediated radical polymerization and prevent their formation as polymerization inhibitors. Various other reagents, such as N-hydroxyphthalimide can also be converted into aminoxyl radicals as part of their chemistry.

Electron-poor aminoxyls, e.g. an oxyacetanilide, also exhibit tradition radical chemistry, abstracting hydrogen or adding across multiple bonds.

== See also ==
- Nitrone — structurally related, an N-oxide of an imine
- Stahl oxidation
