= Β-Isophorone =

β-Isophorone
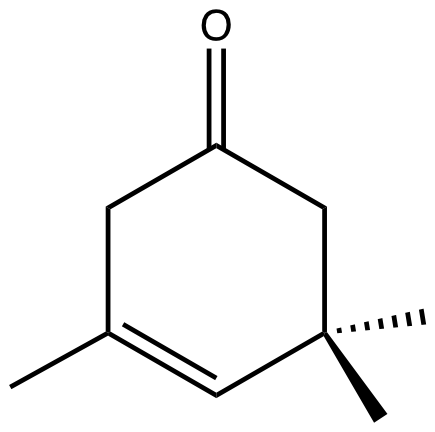

Names
- Preferred IUPAC name 3,5,5-Trimethylcyclohex-3-en-1-one

Identifiers
CAS Number	471-01-2
3D model (JSmol)	Interactive image
ChemSpider	9704
ECHA InfoCard	100.006.760
EC Number	207-434-1
PubChem CID	10108
UNII	R817UQW62V
CompTox Dashboard (EPA)	DTXSID90197034
- InChI: InChI=1S/C9H14O/c1-7-4-8(10)6-9(2,3)5-7/h5H,4,6H2,1-3H3 Key: LKOKKQDYMZUSCG-UHFFFAOYSA-N
- SMILES: CC1=CC(CC(=O)C1)(C)C

Properties
Chemical formula	C_{9}H_{14}O
Molar mass	138.210 g·mol^{−1}
Appearance	Colorless liquid
Boiling point	189 °C (372 °F; 462 K)

Hazards
- GHS labelling
Pictograms	(GHS06: Toxic) (GHS07: Exclamation mark) (GHS08: Health hazard)
Signal word	Danger
Hazard statements	H302, H312, H319, H331, H335, H351
Precautionary statements	P201, P202, P261, P264, P270, P271, P280, P281, P301+P312, P302+P352, P304+P340, P305+P351+P338, P308+P313, P311, P312, P321, P322, P330, P337+P313, P363, P403+P233, P405, P501
- Except where otherwise noted, data are given for materials in their standard state (at 25 °C [77 °F], 100 kPa). Infobox references

β-Isophorone is an organic compound with the formula (CH_{3})_{3}C_{6}H_{7}O. Classified as a β,γ-unsaturated ketone, it is an isomer of and common impurity in the major industrial intermediate α-isophorone, which is produced from acetone. Like the alpha isomer, beta-isophorone is a colorless liquid.

== See also ==
- Phorone
