= Pempidine =

Chemical compound

Identifiers
- IUPAC name: 1,2,2,6,6-Pentamethylpiperidine
- CAS Number: 79-55-0
- PubChem CID: 6603
- ChemSpider: 6353
- UNII: N5I18JI9D6
- ChEMBL: ChEMBL1617409
- CompTox Dashboard (EPA): DTXSID7046962
- ECHA InfoCard: 100.001.102

Chemical and physical data
- Formula: C_{10}H_{21}N
- Molar mass: 155.285 g·mol^{−1}
- 3D model (JSmol): Interactive image
- SMILES: CC1(CCCC(N1C)(C)C)C

Pempidine is a nicotinic antagonist drug, first reported in 1958 by two research groups working independently, and introduced as an oral treatment for hypertension.

== Pharmacology ==
Reports on the "classical" pharmacology of pempidine have been published. The Spinks group, at ICI, compared pempidine, its N-ethyl analogue, and mecamylamine in considerable detail, with additional data related to several structurally simpler compounds.

== Toxicology ==
LD_{50} for the HCl salt of pempidine in mice: 74 mg/kg (intravenous); 125 mg/kg (intraperitoneal); 413 mg/kg (oral).

== Chemistry ==
Pempidine is an aliphatic, sterically hindered, cyclic, tertiary amine, which is a weak base: in its protonated form it has a pK_{a} of 11.25.

Pempidine is a liquid with a boiling point of 187–188 °C and a density of 0.858 g/cm^{3}.

Two early syntheses of this compound are those of Leonard and Hauck, and Hall. These are very similar in principle: Leonard and Hauck reacted phorone with ammonia, to produce 2,2,6,6-tetramethyl-4-piperidone, which was then reduced by means of the Wolff–Kishner reduction to 2,2,6,6-tetramethylpiperidine. This secondary amine was then N-methylated using methyl iodide and potassium carbonate.

Hall's method involved reacting acetone with ammonia in the presence of calcium chloride to give 2,2,6,6-tetramethyl-4-piperidone, which was then reduced under Wolff–Kishner conditions, followed by N-methylation of the resulting 2,2,6,6-tetramethylpiperidine with methyl p-toluenesulfonate.
