= N-Hydroxyphthalimide =

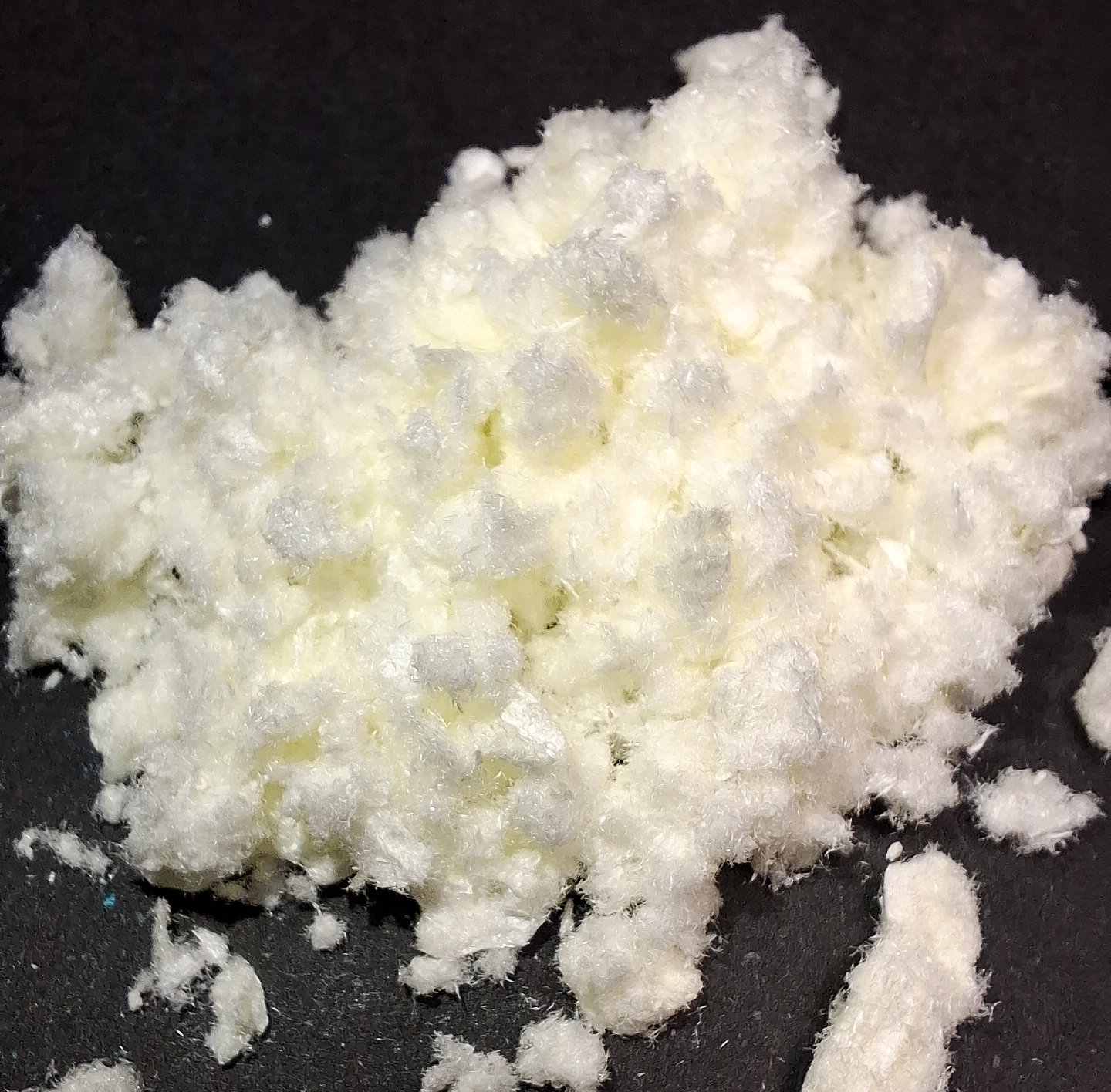
- Yellow Polymorph

Names
- Preferred IUPAC name 2-Hydroxy-1H-isoindole-1,3(2H)-dione

Identifiers
CAS Number	524-38-9
3D model (JSmol)	Interactive image
ChEMBL	ChEMBL276057
ChemSpider	10215
ECHA InfoCard	100.007.600
EC Number	208-358-1
PubChem CID	10665
UNII	BXI99M81X0
CompTox Dashboard (EPA)	DTXSID7060170
- InChI: InChI=1S/C8H5NO3/c10-7-5-3-1-2-4-6(5)8(11)9(7)12/h1-4,12H Key: CFMZSMGAMPBRBE-UHFFFAOYSA-N
- SMILES: O=C2N(O)C(C1=CC=CC=C12)=O

Properties
Chemical formula	C_{8}H_{5}NO_{3}
Molar mass	163.132 g·mol^{−1}
Appearance	white to pale yellow crystalline solid
Density	1.64 g/mL
Melting point	233°C
Boiling point	370°C
Solubility in water	water, polar organic solvents

Hazards
- GHS labelling
Pictograms	(GHS07: Exclamation mark)
Signal word	Warning
Hazard statements	H315, H319, H335
Precautionary statements	P261, P264, P271, P280, P302+P352, P304+P340, P305+P351+P338, P312, P321, P332+P313, P337+P313, P362, P403+P233, P405, P501
- Except where otherwise noted, data are given for materials in their standard state (at 25 °C [77 °F], 100 kPa). Infobox references

N-Hydroxyphthalimide is the organic compound with the formula C_{6}H_{4}(CO)_{2}NOH. A white or yellow solid, it is a derivative of phthalimide. The compound is used as a catalyst in the synthesis of other organic compounds. It is soluble in water and organic solvents such as acetic acid, ethyl acetate and acetonitrile.

== Occurrence and production ==
As described by Lassar Cohn in 1880, N-hydroxyphthalimide was produced from phthaloyl chloride and hydroxylamine hydrochloride in the presence of sodium carbonate.

Synthesis of N-hydroxyphthalimide from phthaloyl chloride using hydroxylamine hydrochloride

The product forms as a red sodium salt under basic conditions, while white N-hydroxyphthalimide precipitates in 55% yield as the solution is acidified. N-hydroxyphthalimide is also produced by reacting hydroxylamine hydrochloride with diethyl phthalate in the presence of sodium acetate, or with phthalic anhydride in the presence of sodium carbonate with heating. In the last case, an overall yield of 76% is produced following purification by recrystallization.

Microwave irradiation of phthalic anhydride and hydroxylamine hydrochloride in pyridine produces N-hydroxyphthalimide in 81% yield. Even in the absence of a base, phthalic anhydride and hydroxylamine phosphate react to produce N-hydroxyphthalimide in 86% yield when heated to 130 °C.

Preparation of N-hydroxyphthalimide from phthalic anhydride

== Properties ==
N-Hydroxyphthalimide exists in two polymorphs, colorless and yellow, In the colorless white form, the NOH group is rotated about 1.19° from the plane of the molecule, while in the yellow form it is much closer to planarity (0.06° rotation).

The color of the synthesized N-hydroxyphthalimide is determined by the solvent used; the color transition from white to yellow is irreversible. N-Hydroxyphthalimide forms strongly colored, mostly yellow or red salts with alkali and heavy metals, ammonia and amines. Hydrolysis of N-hydroxyphthalimide by the addition of strong bases produces phthalic acid monohydroxamic acid by adding water across one of the carbon–nitrogen bonds. N-Hydroxyphthalimide ethers, on the other hand, are colorless and provide O-alkylhydroxylamines by alkaline hydrolysis or cleavage through hydrazine hydrate.

The "phthalylhydroxylamine" reported by Cohn was known to have a molecular formula of C_{8}H_{5}NO_{3}, but the exact structure was not known. Three possibilities were discussed and are shown in the Figure below: a mono-oxime of phthalic anhydride ("phthaloxime", I), an expanded ring with two heteroatoms, (2,3-benzoxazine-1,4-dione, II), and N-hydroxyphthalimide (III). It was not until the 1950s that Cohn's product was definitely shown to be N-hydroxyphthalimide (III).

Three structural isomers of C_{8}H_{5}NO_{3} considered as Cohn's "phthalylhydroxylamine"

== Applications and reactions ==
Nefkens and Tesser developed a technique for generating active esters from N-hydroxyphthalimide for use in peptide synthesis, an approach later extended to using N-hydroxysuccinimide. The ester linkage is formed between the N-hydroxyphthalimide and a carboxylic acid by elimination of water, the coupling achieved with N,N′-dicyclohexylcarbodiimide (DCC). For peptide synthesis, the N-terminus of the growing peptide is protected with tert-butyloxycarbonyl while its C-terminus (Z–NH–CH(R)–COOH) is coupled to N-hydroxyphthalimide. An ester of the next amino acid in the desired peptide sequence is shaken with activated ester, adding to the chain and displacing the N-hydroxyphthalimide. This reaction is quantitative and nearly instantaneous at 0 °C. The resulting ester needs to be hydrolysed before the cycle can be repeated.

Conversion of the C-terminus of a peptide to an active ester of N-hydroxyphthalimide

The N-hydroxyphthalimide can be removed by shaking with sodium bicarbonate, but the N-hydroxysuccinimide approach shows greater reactivity and convenience, and is generally preferred.

Esters of N-hydroxyphthalimide and activated sulfonic acids such as trifluoromethanesulfonic anhydride or p-toluenesulfonyl chloride are used as so-called photoacids, which split off protons during UV irradiation.

UV reaction with NHPI triflate

The protons generated serve for the targeted local degradation of acid-sensitive photoresists.

N-Hydroxyphthalimide can be converted with vinyl acetate in the presence of palladium(II)acetate to the N-vinyloxyphthalimide, which is quantitatively hydrogenated to N-ethoxyphthalimide and subsequently O-ethylhydroxylamine.

Synthesis of O-alkoxyamines via N-hydroxyphthalimides

A variety of functional groups can be oxidized with the aminoxyl radical (phthalimide-N-oxyl, PINO) formed by the abstraction of a hydrogen atom from N-hydroxyphthalimide under gentle conditions (similar to TEMPO):

Formation of the PINO radical

Using molecular oxygen alkanes can be oxidized to form alcohols, secondary alcohols to ketones, acetals to esters and alkenes to epoxides. Amides can be converted into carbonyl compounds with N-hydroxyphthalimide and cobalt(II)salts under mild conditions.

Oxidation of amides with N-hydroxyphthalimide

Efficient oxidation reactions of precursors of important basic chemicals are of particular technical interest. For example, ε-caprolactam can be prepared using NHPI from the so-called KA oil ("ketone-alcohol" oil, a mixture of cyclohexanol and cyclohexanone) which is obtained during the oxidation of cyclohexane. The reaction proceeds via cyclohexanol hydroperoxide, which reacts with ammonia to give peroxydicyclohexylamine followed by a rearrangement in the presence of catalytic amounts of lithium chloride.

Oxidation of KA oil to caprolactam

The use of N-hydroxyphthalimide as a catalyst in the oxidation of KA oil avoids the formation of the undesirable by-product ammonium sulfate which is produced by the conventional ε-caprolactam synthesis (Beckmann rearrangement of cyclohexanone oxime with sulfuric acid).

Alkanes are converted into nitroalkanes in the presence of nitrogen dioxide.

Nitrogenation/oxidation of cyclohexane by means of NHPI

Cyclohexane is converted at 70 °C with nitrogen dioxide/air into a mixture of nitrocyclohexane (70%), cyclohexyl nitrate (7%) and cyclohexanol (5%).

N-hydroxyphthalimide serves as an oxidizing agent in photographic developers and as charge control agents in toners have been described in the patent literature.

== Phthalimido-N-oxyl (PINO) ==
The radical derived by removal of a hydrogen atom from N-hydroxyphthalimide is called N-phthalimido-N-oxyl, acronym being PINO. It is a powerful H-atom abstracting agent. The bond dissociation energy of NHPI (i.e., PINO–H) is 88–90 kcal/mol (370–380 kJ/mol), depending on the solvent.
