= James M. Bobbitt =

American chemist and professor (1930–2021)

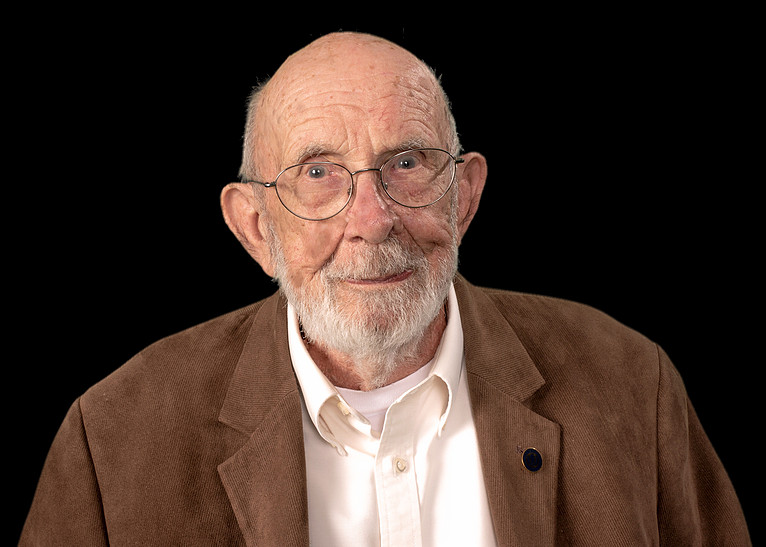
- Bobbitt in 2019
- Born: January 30, 1930; Charleston, West Virginia, U.S.
- Died: November 22, 2021 (aged 91); Windham, Connecticut, U.S.
- Education: West Virginia University (BS); Ohio State University (PhD)
- Awards: Tour Speaker of the Year Award of the American Chemical Society 1969; American Chemical Society Tour Speaker 1962, 1963, 1967, 1969, 1975–1982; Alumni Teaching Award (University of Connecticut)
- Scientific career
- Fields: Organic chemistry
- Workplaces: Ohio State University; Wayne State University; University of Connecticut
- Doctoral advisor: Melville L. Wolfrom

James McCue Bobbitt (January 18, 1930 – November 22, 2021) was an American chemist and academic who taught chemistry at the University of Connecticut from 1956 to 1991 and developed the Bobbitt reaction.

== Early life and education ==
Bobbitt was born on January 18, 1930, in Charleston, West Virginia, to parents James Sterling Bobbitt and Grace McCue Bobbitt. He earned a Bachelor of Science degree in chemistry from West Virginia University in 1951 and a PhD from Ohio State University in 1955, working with Melville L. Wolfrom on periodate oxidations.

== Research and career ==
Bobbitt worked from 1952 to 1955 as a teaching assistant at Ohio State. He then moved to Wayne State University, as a postdoctoral fellow in the research group of Carl Djerassi, working on isoquinoline alkaloids. In 1956, he was hired as a lecturer at the University of Connecticut where he became professor of chemistry from 1969 to 1991. He served as Department Head of Chemistry from 1956 to 1972. In 1992 he became professor emeritus but continued to work in the laboratory, with a focus on oxidation chemistry.

In 1959, he received a National Science Foundation fellowship to work with Hans Schmid at the University of Zürich in Switzerland on iridoid glycosides. Bobbitt also worked as a visiting lecturer; from 1964 to 1965 at the University of East Anglia under the direction of Alan R. Katritzky; in June 1968 with a short DAAD grant at the University of Kiel with Burchard Franck; from 1971 to 1990 in a collaboration with Tohoku University in Sendai, Japan with Tetsuji Kametani and Tetsuo Osa on catalytic oxidations; and at La Trobe University in Australia from 1980 to 1981 and at the University of Adelaide in 1985.

His research focused on alkaloids, preparative electrochemistry, and oxidation chemistry. Additional research interests included the synthesis of nitrogen heterocycles, thin-layer chromatography, electrolytic oxidation and oxoammonium salt oxidation of alcohols with stoichiometric amounts of Bobbitt's salt. He developed what became known as the Bobbitt reaction for the synthesis of tetrahydroisoquinoline and its derivatives in 1965.

In 1968, Bobbitt became lead instructor for an American Chemical Society course on thin-layer chromatography and taught seminars across the US on that subject. In 1970, he became president of the UConn Sigma Xi chapter, and in 1975, the president of the UConn Phi Beta Kappa chapter.

== Personal life ==
Bobbitt met his wife, Jane Ann Hickman, while they were both students at West Virginia University. They had three children: John, Annie, and Laura. In retirement, Bobbitt made wine, raised bees, and gardened, but he remained active in the laboratory and writing papers well into his 80s.

Bobbitt was critically injured in a car crash on November 22, 2021, in Windham, Connecticut. He died hours later at Hartford Hospital.

== Books and selected papers ==
Bobbitt was the author of two books on chromatography and some 120 research articles.

=== Books ===
- James M. Bobbitt: Thin-layer Chromatography. Reinhold Publishing Co., New York 1963.
- J. M. Bobbitt, A. E Schwarting, and R. J. Gritter, Introduction to Chromatography. Reinhold Publishing, Co. New York (1968), Second Edition, R. J. Gritter, J. M. Bobbitt and A. E. Schwarting, Holden-Day, Inc., Oakland California.

=== Reviews ===
- J. M. Bobbitt: Periodate Oxidations of Carbohydrates, Advances in Carbohydrate Chemistry, Vol. 11, 1956, 1-42.
- J. M. Bobbitt: The Chemistry of 4-Oxy- and 4-keto-1,2,3,4-tetrahyhdroisoquinolines, Advances in Heterocyclic Chemistry, Vol. 15, 1973, 99-128. (The Bobbitt Reaction).
- J. M. Bobbitt, A. J. Bourque: Syntheses of heterocycles using aminoacetals, Heterocycles. Vol. 25, 1987, pp. 601–616.
- J. M. Bobbitt and K.-P. Segebarth: The Iridoid Glycosides and Similar Substances, in Cyxlopentanoterpine Derivatives, W. I. Taylor and A. R. Battersby, Eds. Marcel Dekker, 1969, 1-139.
- T. Osa, Y. Kashiwagi, J. M. Bobbitt, and Z. Ma: Electroorganic Synthesis on Catalyst Coated Electrodes. In Electronic Synthesis, R. D. Little and N. L. Weinberf, Eds., Marcel Dekker, Inc. New York, 343-354.1991.
- J. M. Bobbitt, C. Brückner and N. Merbouh: Oxoammonium Salt and Nitroxide Catalyzed Oxidations of Alcohols. Organic Reactions, Vol. 74, 2009 103-424.

=== Selected papers ===
- M. L Wolfrom, J. M. Bobbitt: Periodate oxidation of cyclic 1,3, -diketones. Journal of the American Chemical Society Vol. 78, 1956, 2489.
- C. Djerassi, S. K. Figdor, J. M. Bobbitt, F. I. Markley: Alkaloid studies. XIV. The structure of the cactus alkaloid piloceriene. Journal of the American Chemical Society. Volume 78, 1956, 3861.
- J. M. Bobbitt, H. Schmid, T. B. Africa. Catalpa glycosides. 1. The chararctization of catalposide. Journal of Organic Chemistry Vol. 26, 1961, 2230.
- J. M. Bobbitt, J. C. Sih: Synthesis of isoquinolines. VII. 4-hydroxy-1,2,3,4-tetrahydroisoquinolines. Journal of Organic Chemistry. Vol. 33, 1968, 856-859.
- J. M. Bobbitt, A. R. Katritzky, R. D. Kennewell, M. Snarey: Steric requirements of sp2-Hybridized lone electron pairs. Part 1. The conformation of –(pyridylmethylene-onesnes. J. Chem. Soc (B) 1968, 550-553.
- J. M. Bobbitt, A. S. Steinfeld, K. H. Weisgraber, S. Dutta: Synthesis of isoquinolines. X. 1-alkyl-1,2,3,4-tetrahydroisoquinoilines. in:Journal of Organic Chemistry. Vol. 34, 1969, 2487.
- J. M. Bobbitt, I. Noguchi, H. Yagi, K. H. Weisgraber: Electrochemistry of natural Products. III. A stereoselective, stereospecific phenol coupling reaction. In: Journal of the American Chemical Society 1971, 93, 551.
- J. M. Bobbitt, S. J. Huang: A simulated research project in synthetic organic chemistry. An undergraduate laboratory. In: J. Chem. Educ. Volume 51, 1974, 58.
- J. M. Bobbitt, I. G. C. Coutts, M. R. Hamblin, E.J. Tinley: The enzymatic oxidation of phenolic tetrahydroisoquinoline-1-carboxylic acids. In: Journal of the Chemical Society, Perkin Transactions 1, 1979, pp 2744–2749.
