= Lassar Cohn =

Lassar Cohn, Lassar-Cohn or Ernst Lassar Cohn (6 September 1858 – 9 October 1922) was a Prussian chemist and professor at the University of Königsberg who wrote several influential textbooks on organic analysis including methods for the analysis of urine.

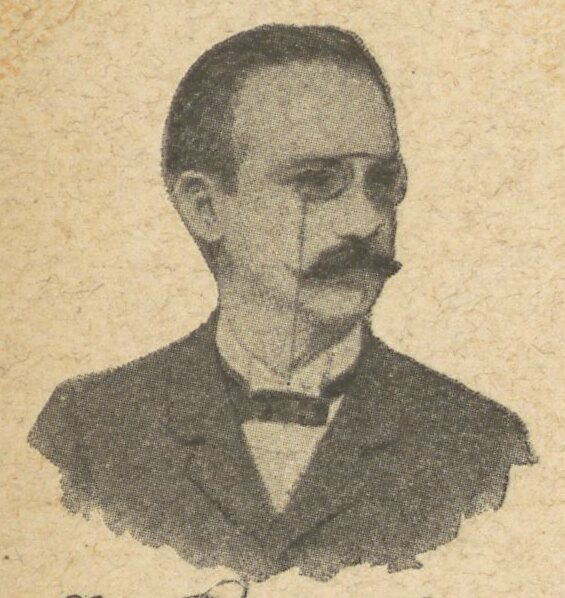

Cohn was born in the Jewish family of Jacob Marcus Cohen and Hanna Hewe in Hamburg. He studied at the Gymnasium in Königsberg before going the University of Heidelberg. He also studied at Bonn and Königsberg. After receiving a doctorate in 1880 and habilitation in 1888 he joined the University of Königsberg and became a professor in 1894. He worked for some time from 1897 in Munich at the Ludwig-Maximilians-Universität München (LMU Munich), but returned to Königsberg in 1902. In 1907, he also began to work with the chemical industry. Cohn's major works included studies of organic compounds, tartaric acid and its esters, bile chemistry and the recycling of industrial wastes. He innovated methods for nitrogen measurement, saccharimetry, and urine analysis.
