= Triacetonamine =

Triacetone amine

Names
- Preferred IUPAC name 2,2,6,6-Tetramethylpiperidin-4-one
- Other names Triacetone amine

Identifiers
CAS Number	826-36-8
3D model (JSmol)	Interactive image
ChEMBL	ChEMBL117614
ChemSpider	12665
ECHA InfoCard	100.011.413
EC Number	212-554-2
PubChem CID	13220
RTECS number	TO0127900
UNII	2K4430S3XP
CompTox Dashboard (EPA)	DTXSID4041527
- InChI: InChI=1S/C9H17NO/c1-8(2)5-7(11)6-9(3,4)10-8/h10H,5-6H2,1-4H3 Key: JWUXJYZVKZKLTJ-UHFFFAOYSA-N; InChI=1/C9H17NO/c1-8(2)5-7(11)6-9(3,4)10-8/h10H,5-6H2,1-4H3 Key: JWUXJYZVKZKLTJ-UHFFFAOYAQ
- SMILES: O=C1CC(NC(C)(C)C1)(C)C

Properties
Chemical formula	C_{9}H_{17}NO
Molar mass	155.241 g·mol^{−1}
Appearance	Colorless low-melting solid
Density	0.882 g/cm^{3}
Melting point	43 °C (109 °F; 316 K)
Boiling point	205 °C (401 °F; 478 K)
Solubility in water	Moderate
Solubility in other solvents	Most organic solvents

Hazards
- Occupational safety and health (OHS/OSH)
Main hazards	flammable
- GHS labelling
Pictograms	(GHS05: Corrosive) (GHS07: Exclamation mark)
Signal word	Danger
Hazard statements	H290, H302, H314, H315, H317, H319, H335, H412
Precautionary statements	P234, P260, P264, P270, P271, P272, P273, P280, P301+P312, P301+P330+P331, P302+P352, P303+P361+P353, P304+P340, P305+P351+P338, P310, P312, P321, P330, P332+P313, P333+P313, P337+P313, P362, P363, P390, P403+P233, P404, P405, P501
Flash point	73 °C; 164 °F; 346 K

Related compounds
Related compounds	Piperidine
- Except where otherwise noted, data are given for materials in their standard state (at 25 °C [77 °F], 100 kPa). verify (what is ?) Infobox references

Triacetonamine is an organic compound with the formula OC(CH_{2}CMe_{2})_{2}NH (where Me = CH_{3}). It is a colorless or white solid that melts near room temperature. The compound is an intermediate in the preparation of 2,2,6,6-tetramethylpiperidine, a sterically hindered base and precursor to the reagent called TEMPO. Triacetonamine is formed by the poly-aldol condensation of acetone in the presence of ammonia and calcium chloride:

3 (CH_{3})_{2}CO + NH_{3} → OC(CH_{2}CMe_{2})_{2}NH + 2 H_{2}O

Reductive amination of triacetonamine gives 4-amino-2,2,6,6-tetramethylpiperidine.

It is primarily used as a stabilizer for plastics, typically via its conversion to number of hindered amine light stabilizers, but also finds use as a chemical feedstock. It is used to prepare the hindered amine 2,2,6,6-tetramethylpiperidine, CH_{2}[CH_{2}C(CH_{3})_{2}]_{2}NH, as well as the radical oxidizer 4-Hydroxy-TEMPO.

Triacetonamine has known application in the synthesis of alpha-eucaine. A surprising use of triacetonamine was in the synthesis of Elexacaftor.

A continuous process for the production of triacetonamine was developed:
