= N-Oxoammonium salt =

Class of organic compounds

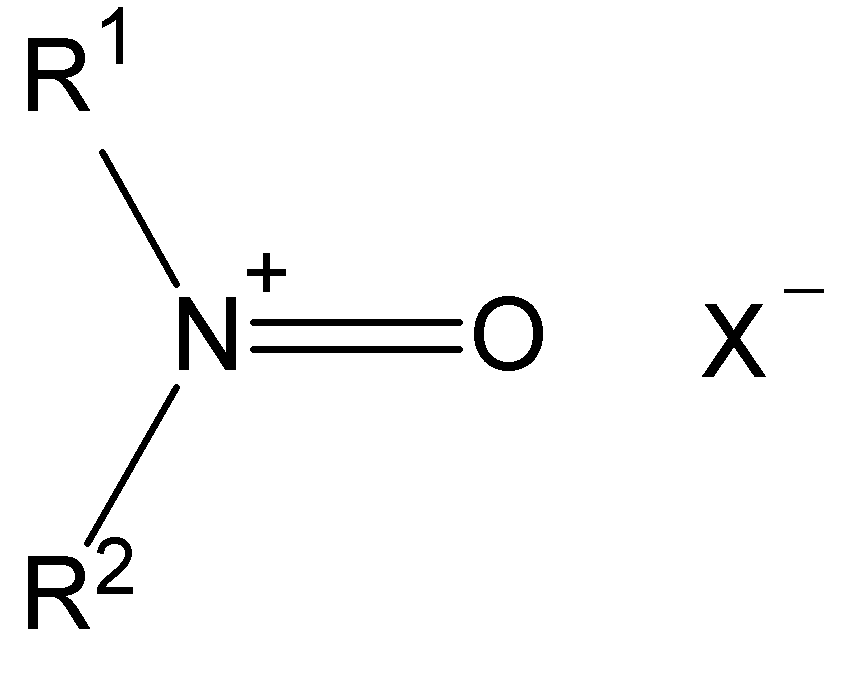
Structure of N-oxoammonium salts

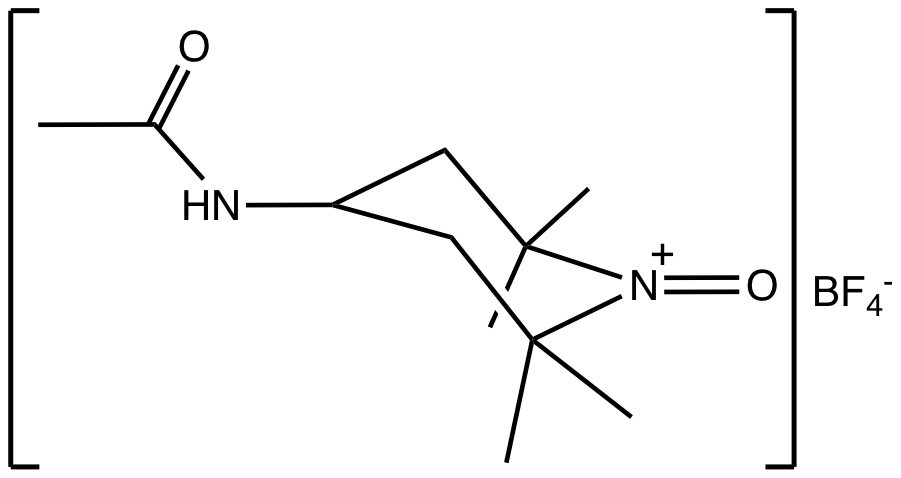
The structure of Bobbitt's salt, an N-oxoammonium salt.

N-Oxoammonium salts are a class of organic compounds with the formula [R_{1}R_{2}=O]X^{−}. The cation [R_{1}R_{2}=O] is of interest for the dehydrogenation of alcohols. Oxoammonium salts are diamagnetic, whereas the nitroxide has a doublet ground state. A prominent N-oxoammonium salt is prepared by oxidation of (2,2,6,6-tetramethylpiperidin-1-yl)oxyl, commonly referred to as [TEMPO]^{+}. A less expensive analogue is Bobbitt's salt.

== Structure and bonding ==
Oxoammonium cations are isoelectronic with carbonyls and structurally related to aldoximes (hydroxylamines), and aminoxyl (nitroxide) radicals, with which they can interconvert via a series of redox steps. According to X-ray crystallography, the N–O distance in [TEMPO]BF_{4} is 1.184 Å, 0.1 Å shorter than the N–O distance of 1.284 Å in the charge-neutral TEMPO. Similarly, the N in [TEMPO]^{+} is nearly planar, but the O moves 0.1765 Å out of the plane in the neutral TEMPO.

The N-oxoammonium salts are used for oxidation of alcohols to carbonyl groups, as well as other forms of oxoammonium-catalyzed oxidations. The nitroxyl TEMPO reacts via its N-oxoammonium salt.

== See also ==
- Nitrone – structurally related, the N-oxide of an imine
