= Isophorone =

Alpha-beta unsaturated cyclic ketone

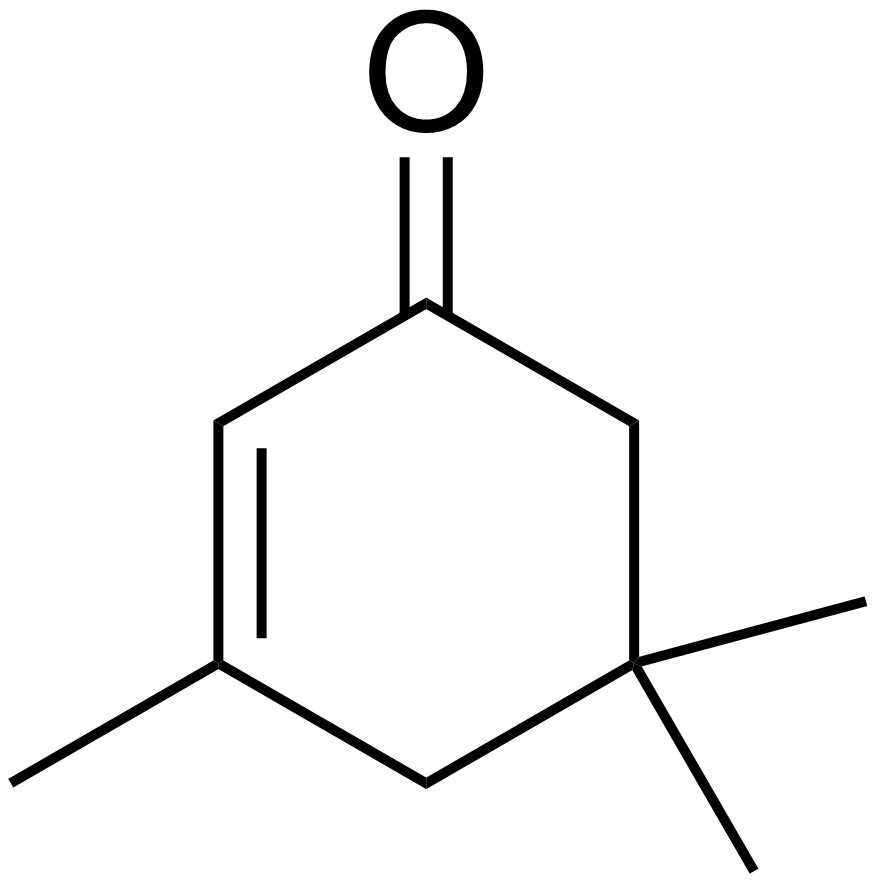
- Isophorone

Names
- Preferred IUPAC name 3,5,5-Trimethylcyclohex-2-en-1-one
- Other names 3,5,5-Trimethyl-2-cyclohexene-1-one; 1,1,3-Trimethyl-3-cyclohexene-5-one; Isoforone; Isoacetophorone; IP

Identifiers
CAS Number	78-59-1
3D model (JSmol)	Interactive image
ChemSpider	6296
ECHA InfoCard	100.001.024
EC Number	201-126-0
KEGG	C14743
PubChem CID	6544
UNII	2BR99VR6WA
CompTox Dashboard (EPA)	DTXSID8020759
- InChI: InChI=1S/C9H14O/c1-7-4-8(10)6-9(2,3)5-7/h4H,5-6H2,1-3H3 Key: HJOVHMDZYOCNQW-UHFFFAOYSA-N; InChI=1/C9H14O/c1-7-4-8(10)6-9(2,3)5-7/h4H,5-6H2,1-3H3 Key: HJOVHMDZYOCNQW-UHFFFAOYAC
- SMILES: O=C1\C=C(/CC(C)(C)C1)C

Properties
Chemical formula	C_{9}H_{14}O
Molar mass	138.210 g·mol^{−1}
Appearance	Colorless to white liquid
Odor	Peppermint-like
Density	0.9255 g/cm^{3}
Melting point	−8.1 °C (17.4 °F; 265.0 K)
Boiling point	215.32 °C (419.58 °F; 488.47 K)
Solubility in water	1.2 g/100 mL
Solubility	ether, acetone, hexane, dichloromethane, benzene, toluene, alcohol
Vapor pressure	0.3 mmHg (20°C)
Refractive index (n_{D})	1.4766
Viscosity	2.62 cP

Thermochemistry
Std enthalpy of formation (Δ_{f}H^{⦵}_{298})	43.4 kJ/mol

Hazards
Flash point	84 °C (183 °F; 357 K)
Autoignition temperature	460 °C (860 °F; 733 K)
Explosive limits	0.8–3.8%
- Lethal dose or concentration (LD, LC)
LD_{50} (median dose)	2330 mg/kg (rat, oral); 2690 mg/kg (mouse, oral)
LC_{50} (median concentration)	4600 ppm (guinea pig, 8 hr)
LC_{Lo} (lowest published)	885 ppm (rat, 6 hr); 1840 ppm (rat, 4 hr)
- NIOSH (US health exposure limits)
PEL (Permissible)	TWA 25 ppm (140 mg/m^{3})
REL (Recommended)	TWA 4 ppm (23 mg/m^{3})
IDLH (Immediate danger)	200 ppm
- Except where otherwise noted, data are given for materials in their standard state (at 25 °C [77 °F], 100 kPa). verify (what is ?) Infobox references

Isophorone is an α,β-unsaturated cyclic ketone. It is a colorless liquid with a characteristic peppermint-like odor, although commercial samples can appear yellowish. Used as a solvent and as a precursor to polymers, it is produced on a large scale industrially.

== Structure and reactivity ==
Isophorone undergoes reactions characteristic of an α,β-unsaturated ketone. Hydrogenation gives the cyclohexanone derivative. Epoxidation with basic hydrogen peroxide affords the oxide.

Isophorone is degraded by attack of hydroxyl radicals.

=== Photodimerization ===
When exposed to sunlight in aqueous solutions, isophorone undergoes 2+2 photocycloaddition to give three isomeric photodimers (Figure). These "diketomers" are cis-syn-cis, head to tail (HT), cys-anti-cys (HT), and head-head (HH). The formation of HH photodimers is favored over HT photodimers with increasing polarity of the medium.

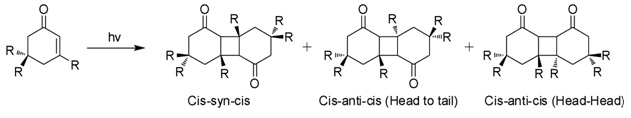

== Natural occurrence ==
Isophorone occurs naturally in cranberries.

== Synthesis ==
Isophorone is produced on a multi-thousand ton scale by the aldol condensation of acetone using KOH. Diacetone alcohol, mesityl oxide, and 3-hydroxy-3,5,5-trimethylcyclohexan-1-one are intermediates. A side product is beta-isophorone, where the C=C group is not conjugated with the ketone.

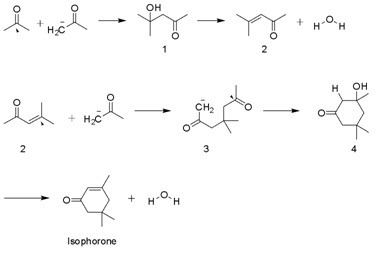

== Applications ==
The partly hydrogenated derivative trimethylcyclohexanone is used in production of polycarbonates. It condenses with phenol to give an analogue of bisphenol A. Polycarbonates produced by phosgenation of these two diols produces a polymer with improved thermal stability. Trimethyladipic acid and 2,2,4-trimethylhexamethylenediamine are produced from trimethylcyclohexanone and trimethylcyclohexanol. They are used to make specialty polyamides. Hydrocyanation gives the nitrile followed by reductive amination gives isophorone diamine. This diamine is used to produce isophorone diisocyanate which has certain niche applications.

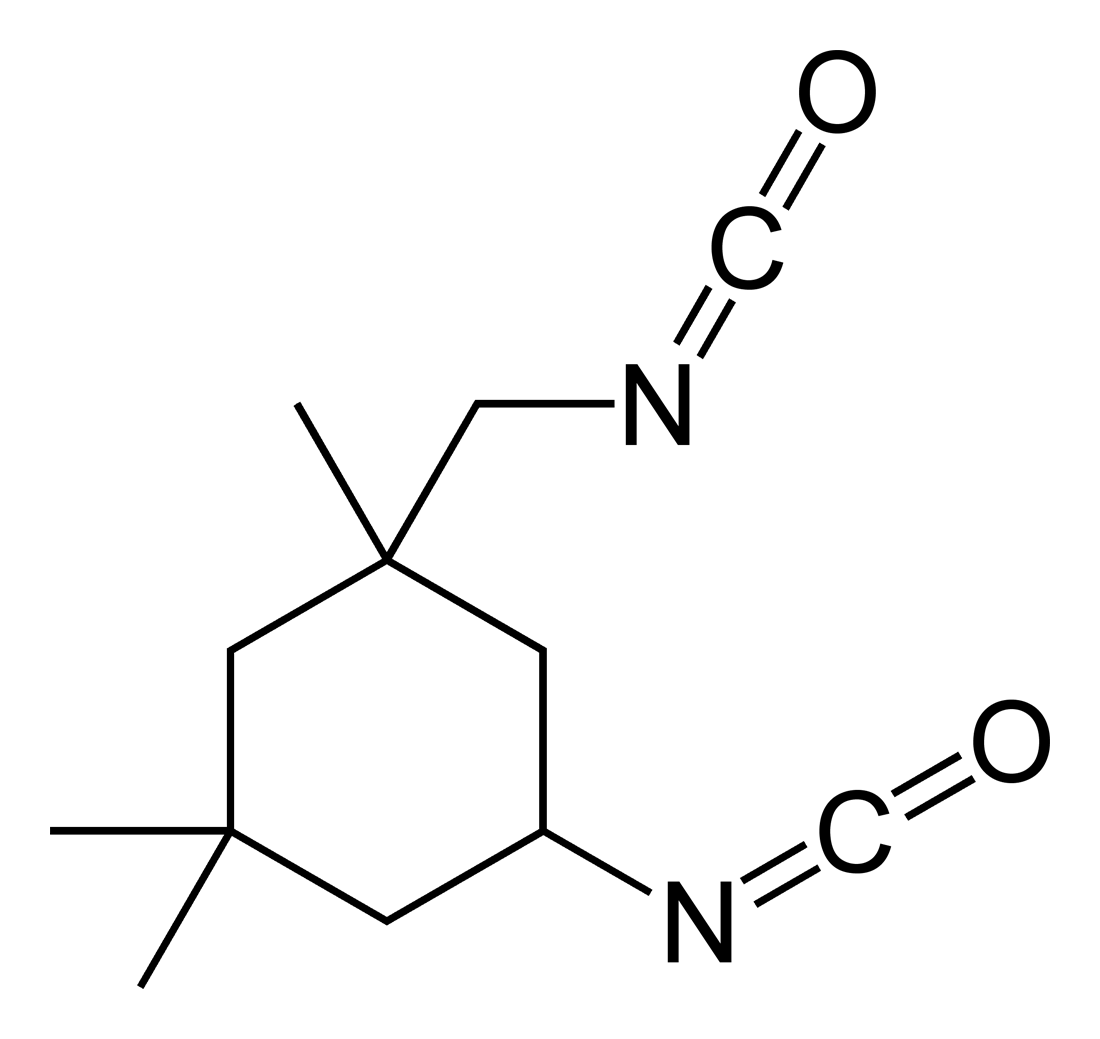
Isophorone diisocyanate is used to produce specialty polyurethanes.

Full hydrogenation gives 3,3,5-Trimethylcyclohexanol, a precursor to both sunscreens and chemical weapons.

== Safety ==
The LD_{50} value of isophorone in rats by oral exposure is 2.3 g/kg. The safety aspects of isophorone have been subject to several studies.

== History ==
The use of isophorone as a solvent resulted from the search for ways to dispose of or recycle acetone, which is a waste product of phenol synthesis by the Hock method.

== See also ==
- Phorone
- β-Isophorone
