= 2,2,6,6-Tetramethylpiperidine =

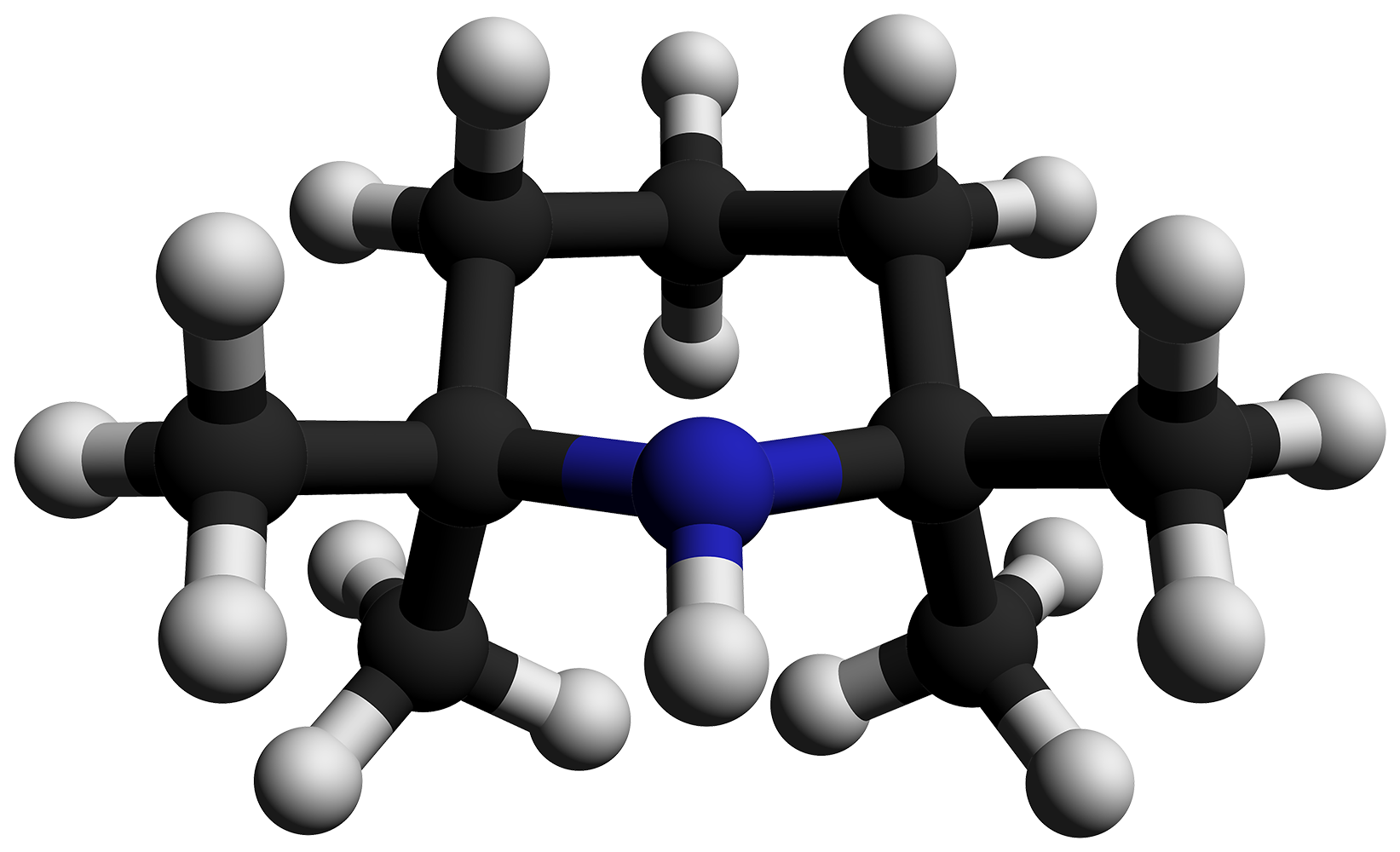

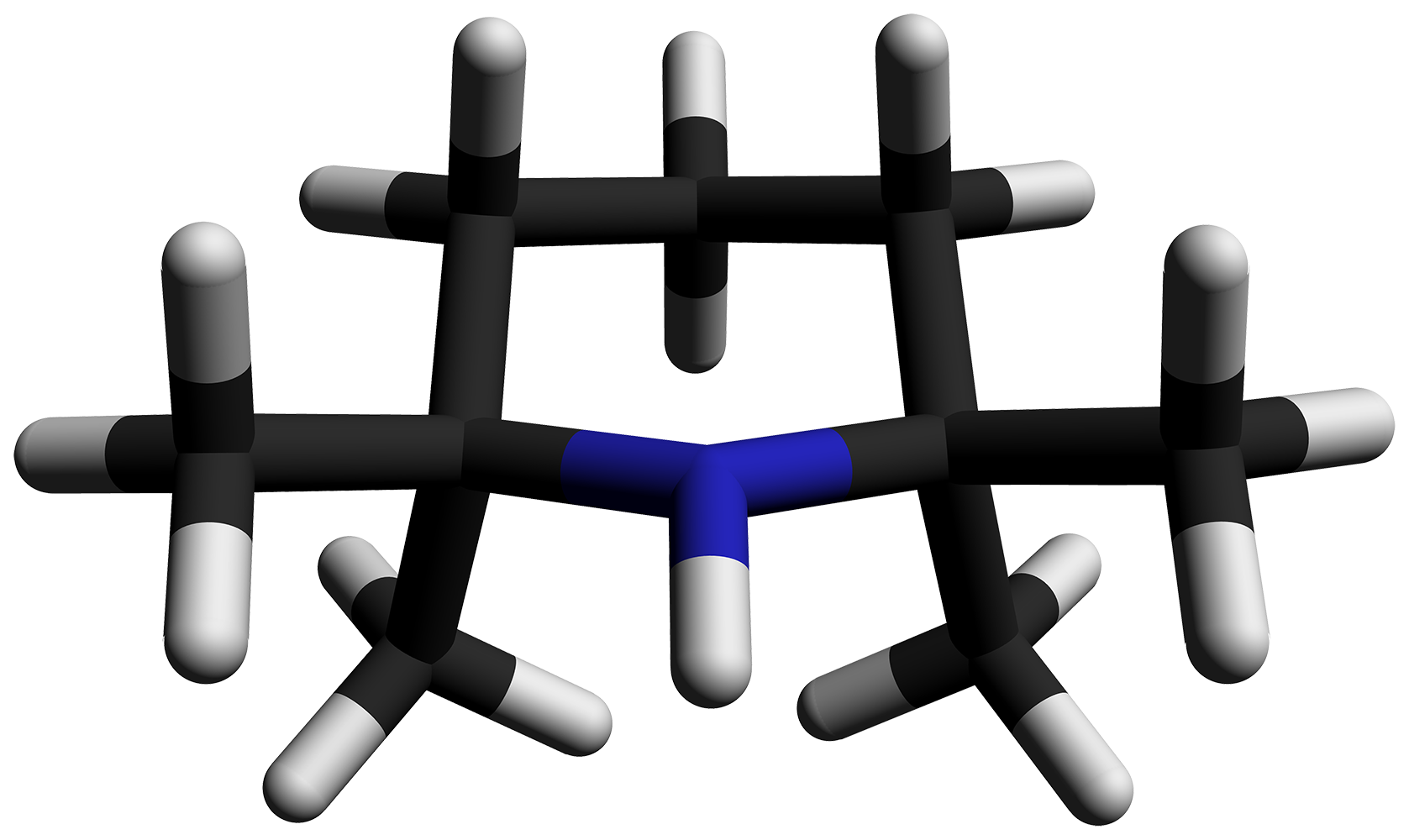

Names
- Preferred IUPAC name 2,2,6,6-Tetramethylpiperidine
- Other names Norpempidine; Tetramethylpiperidine

Identifiers
| CAS Number | 768-66-1 |
| 3D model (JSmol) | Interactive image |
| Abbreviations | TMP |
| ChEMBL | ChEMBL2448812 |
| ChemSpider | 12493 |
| ECHA InfoCard | 100.011.090 |
| EC Number | 212-199-3 |
| PubChem CID | 13035 |
| UNII | 44N9S1YCFM |
| CompTox Dashboard (EPA) | DTXSID0061113 |
- InChI: InChI=1S/C9H19N/c1-8(2)6-5-7-9(3,4)10-8/h10H,5-7H2,1-4H3 Key: RKMGAJGJIURJSJ-UHFFFAOYSA-N; InChI=1/C9H19N/c1-8(2)6-5-7-9(3,4)10-8/h10H,5-7H2,1-4H3 Key: RKMGAJGJIURJSJ-UHFFFAOYAX
- SMILES: N1C(C)(CCCC1(C)C)C

Properties
| Chemical formula | C_{9}H_{19}N |
| Molar mass | 141.254 g/mol |
| Appearance | Clear liquid |
| Density | 0.83 g/mL |
| Melting point | −59 °C (−74 °F; 214 K) |
| Boiling point | 152 °C (306 °F; 425 K) |

Hazards
- GHS labelling
| Pictograms | (GHS02: Flammable) (GHS05: Corrosive) (GHS06: Toxic) (GHS07: Exclamation mark) |
| Signal word | Danger |
| Hazard statements | H226, H301, H302, H314, H315, H319, H332, H335 |
| Precautionary statements | P210, P233, P240, P241, P242, P243, P260, P264, P270, P271, P280, P301+P310, P301+P312, P301+P330+P331, P302+P352, P303+P361+P353, P304+P312, P304+P340, P305+P351+P338, P310, P312, P321, P330, P332+P313, P337+P313, P362, P363, P370+P378, P403+P233, P403+P235, P405, P501 |
- Except where otherwise noted, data are given for materials in their standard state (at 25 °C [77 °F], 100 kPa). verify (what is ?) Infobox references

2,2,6,6-Tetramethylpiperidine, abbreviated TMP, HTMP, or TMPH, is an organic compound of the amine class. In appearance, it is a colorless liquid and has a "fishy", amine-like odor. This amine is used in chemistry as a hindered base (hindered amine). Although TMP finds limited use per se, its derivatives are a mainstay of hindered amine light stabilizers.

TMP is the starting material for an even stronger base, lithium tetramethylpiperidide and the radical species TEMPO. Another non-nucleophilic base is N,N-diisopropylethylamine. Its aqueous pK_{aH} (conjugate acid dissociation constant, a measure of basicity) is 11.07 at 25 °C, while its pK_{a} (acid dissociation constant, a measure of acidity) is approximately 37.

== Preparation ==
Many routes for the synthesis of TMP have been reported. One method starts with a conjugate addition reaction of ammonia to phorone. The intermediate triacetone amine is then reduced in a Wolff-Kishner reaction.

TMP synthesis

== See also ==
- 2,6-Dimethylpiperidine
- Pempidine
- TEMPO ((2,2,6,6-Tetramethylpiperidin-1-yl)oxyl)
