= Hindered amine light stabilizers =

Chemical compound

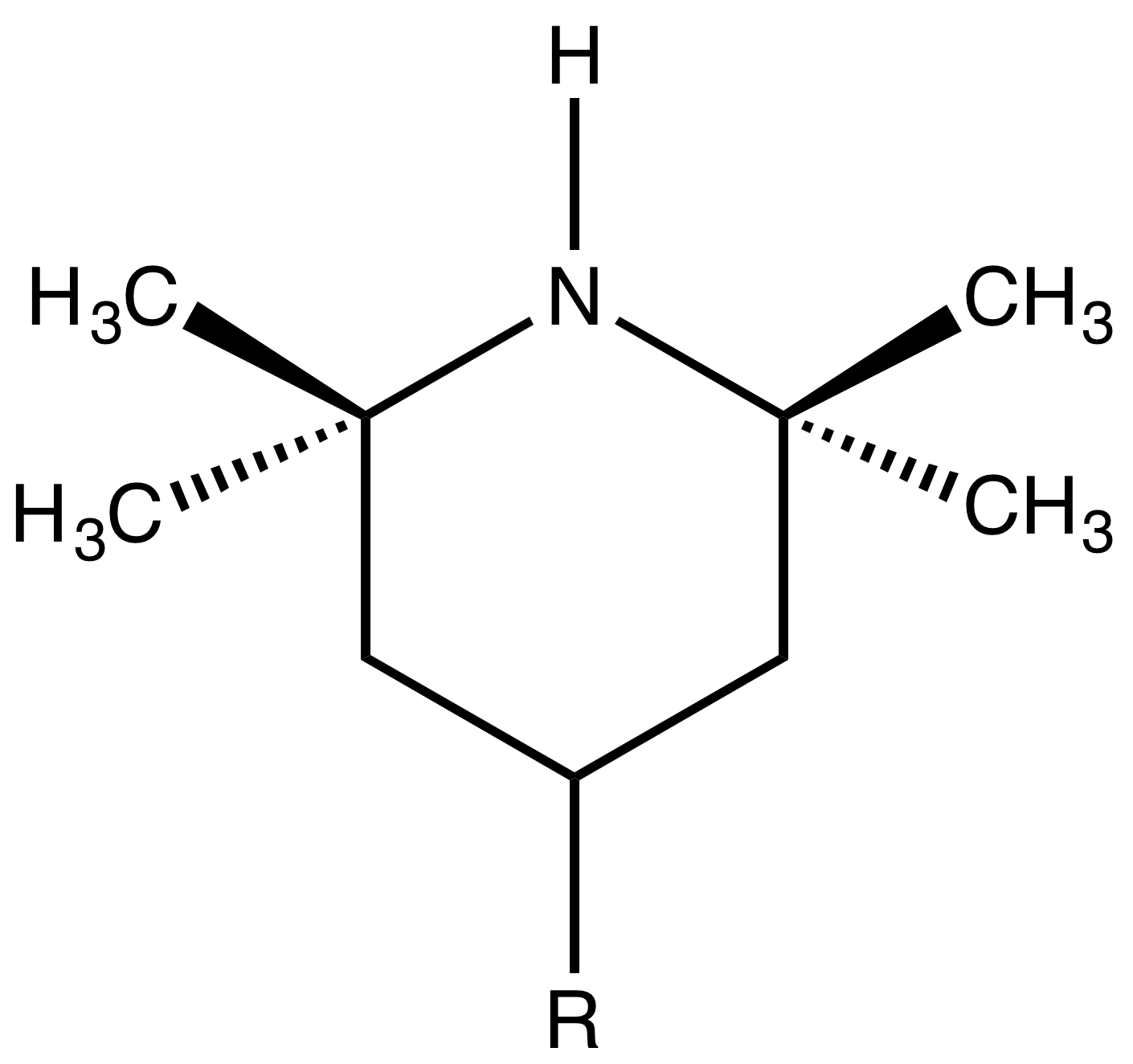
Partial structure of a typical hindered amine light stabilizer

Bis(2,2,6,6-tetramethyl-4-piperidyl) sebacate: a commonly used commercial HAL

Hindered amine light stabilizers (HALS) are chemical compounds containing an amine functional group that are used as stabilizers in plastics and polymers. These compounds are typically derivatives of tetramethylpiperidine and are primarily used to protect the polymers from the effects of photo-oxidation; as opposed to other forms of polymer degradation such as ozonolysis. They are also increasingly being used as thermal stabilizers, particularly for low and moderate level of heat, however during the high temperature processing of polymers (e.g. injection moulding) they remain less effective than traditional phenolic antioxidants.

== Mechanism of action ==
HALS do not absorb UV radiation, but act to inhibit degradation of the polymer by continuously and cyclically removing free radicals that are produced by photo-oxidation of the polymer. The overall process is sometimes referred to as the Denisov cycle, after Evguenii T. Denisov and is exceedingly complex. Broadly, HALS react with the initial polymer peroxy radical (ROO•) and alkyl polymer radicals (R•) formed by the reaction of the polymer and oxygen, preventing further radical oxidation. By these reactions HALS are oxidised to their corresponding aminoxyl radicals (R_{2}NO• c.f. TEMPO), however they are able to return to their initial amine form via a series of additional radical reactions. HALS's high efficiency and longevity are due to this cyclic process wherein the HALS are regenerated rather than consumed during the stabilization process.

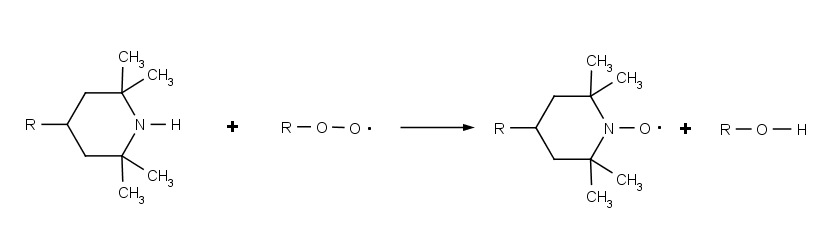
Initial reaction of a HAL with a polymer peroxy radical: this step stabilizes the polymer and converts the HAL to its aminoxyl form

The structure of the HALS makes them resistant to side reactions. The use of a hindered amine possessing no alpha-hydrogens prevents the HALS being converted into a nitrone species and piperidines are resistant to intramolecular Cope reactions. In commercial HALS the reactive piperidine group is usually bonded to bulky chemical scaffold, in order to reduce its volatility during the melt processing of plastic.

== Application ==
Even though HALS are extremely effective in polyethylene and other polyolefins, and polyurethane, they are ineffective in polyvinyl chloride (PVC). It is thought that their ability to form nitroxyl radicals is disrupted due them being readily protonated by HCl released by dehydrohalogenation of PVC.

== See also ==
- BTMPS
- Steric hindrance
