= Bobbitt's salt =

Chemical compound

Names
- IUPAC name N-(2,2,6,6-tetramethyl-1-oxopiperidin-1-ium-4-yl)acetamide;tetrafluoroborate
- Other names 4-(Acetylamino)-2,2,6,6-tetramethyl-1-oxo-piperidinium tetrafluoroborate

Identifiers
| CAS Number | 219543-09-6 |
| 3D model (JSmol) | Interactive image |
| ChemSpider | 2034373 |
| ECHA InfoCard | 100.202.272 |
| PubChem CID | 2753331 |
| CompTox Dashboard (EPA) | DTXSID90372980 |
- InChI: InChI=1S/C11H20N2O2.BF4/c1-8(14)12-9-6-10(2,3)13(15)11(4,5)7-9;2-1(3,4)5/h9H,6-7H2,1-5H3;/q;-1/p+1 Key: HTMHEICBCHCWAU-UHFFFAOYSA-O
- SMILES: [B-](F)(F)(F)F.CC(=O)NC1CC([N+](=O)C(C1)(C)C)(C)C

Properties
| Chemical formula | C_{11}H_{21}BF_{4}N_{2}O_{2} |
| Molar mass | 300.10 g·mol^{−1} |

Hazards
- GHS labelling
| Pictograms | (GHS07: Exclamation mark) |
| Signal word | Warning |
| Hazard statements | H315, H319, H335 |
| Precautionary statements | P261, P264, P271, P280, P302+P352, P304+P340, P305+P351+P338, P312, P321, P332+P313, P337+P313, P362, P403+P233, P405, P501 |
- Except where otherwise noted, data are given for materials in their standard state (at 25 °C [77 °F], 100 kPa). Infobox references

Bobbitt's salt is an oxoammonium compound derived from 4-acetamido-2,2,6,6-tetramethylpiperidine. It contains the tetrafluoroborate anion and is named after the American chemist James M. Bobbitt.

As a less expensive analogue of the N-oxoammonium salt derived from TEMPO, Bobbitt's salt is still mainly used as a catalyst for oxoammonium-catalyzed oxidations.

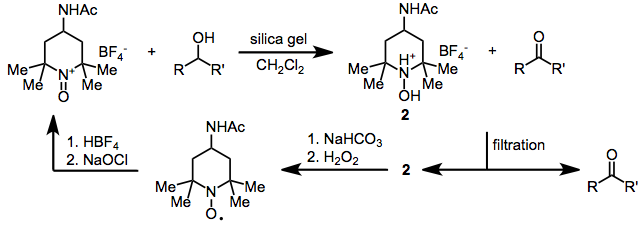
