= TEMPO =

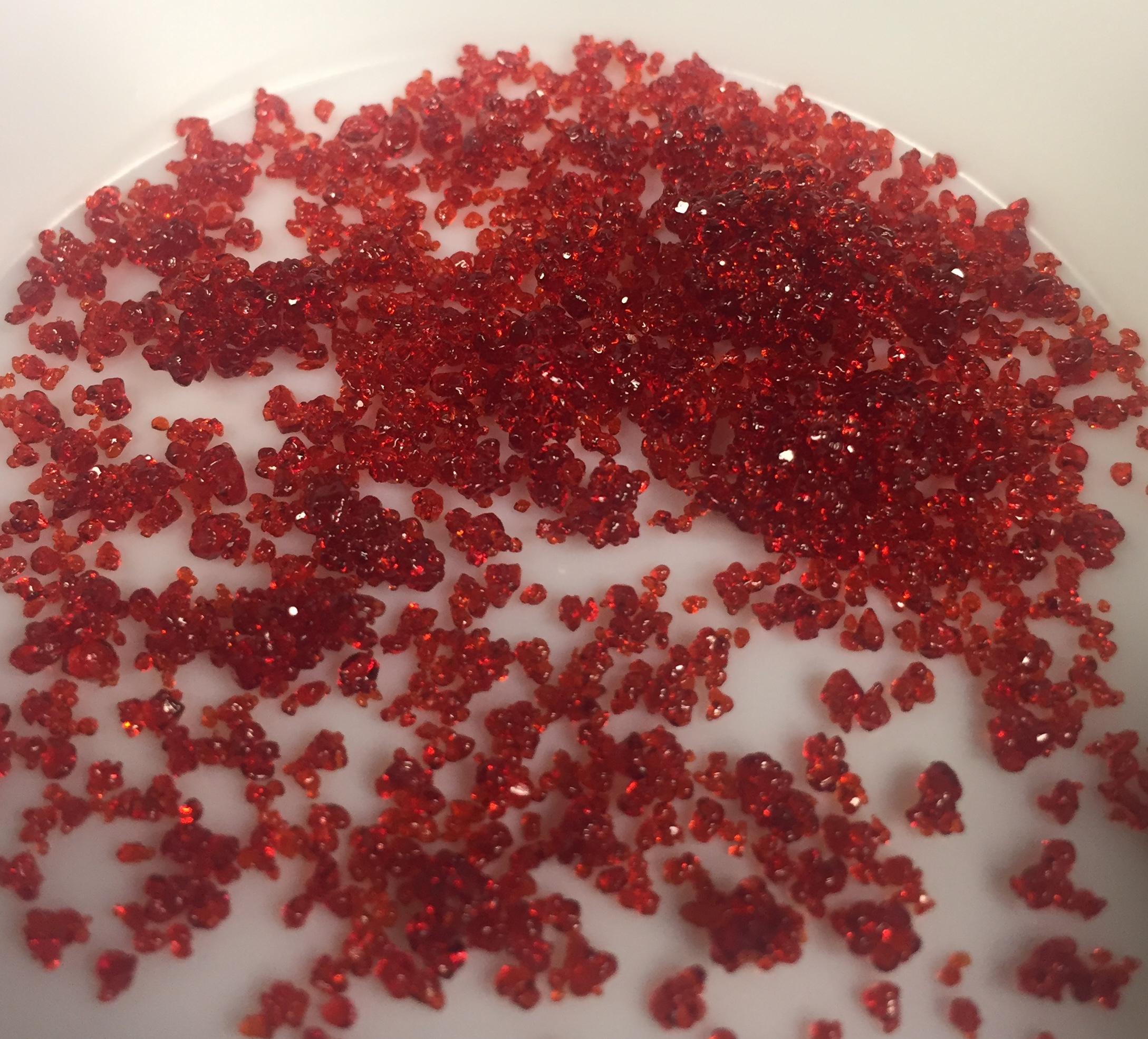

Names
- Preferred IUPAC name (2,2,6,6-Tetramethylpiperidin-1-yl)oxyl
- Other names (2,2,6,6-Tetramethylpiperidin-1-yl)oxidanyl

Identifiers
CAS Number	2564-83-2
3D model (JSmol)	Interactive image
ChEBI	CHEBI:32849
ChEMBL	ChEMBL606971
ChemSpider	2006285
ECHA InfoCard	100.018.081
EC Number	219-888-8
PubChem CID	2724126
RTECS number	TN8991900
UNII	VQN7359ICQ
CompTox Dashboard (EPA)	DTXSID2073300
- InChI: InChI=1S/C9H18NO/c1-8(2)6-5-7-9(3,4)10(8)11/h5-7H2,1-4H3 Key: QYTDEUPAUMOIOP-UHFFFAOYSA-N; InChI=1/C9H18NO/c1-8(2)6-5-7-9(3,4)10(8)11/h5-7H2,1-4H3 Key: QYTDEUPAUMOIOP-UHFFFAOYAP
- SMILES: CC1(CCCC(N1[O])(C)C)C

Properties
Chemical formula	C_{9}H_{18}NO
Molar mass	156.249 g·mol^{−1}
Appearance	Orange-red solid
Melting point	36 to 38 °C (97 to 100 °F; 309 to 311 K)
Boiling point	sublimes under vacuum

Hazards
- GHS labelling
Pictograms	(GHS05: Corrosive)
Signal word	Danger
Hazard statements	H314
Precautionary statements	P260, P264, P273, P280, P301+P330+P331, P303+P361+P353, P304+P340, P305+P351+P338, P310, P321, P363, P405, P501
Safety data sheet (SDS)	External MSDS
- Except where otherwise noted, data are given for materials in their standard state (at 25 °C [77 °F], 100 kPa). verify (what is ?) Infobox references

(2,2,6,6-Tetramethylpiperidin-1-yl)oxyl or (2,2,6,6-tetramethylpiperidin-1-yl)oxidanyl, commonly known as TEMPO, is a chemical compound with the formula (CH_{2})_{3}(CMe_{2})_{2}NO. This heterocyclic compound is a red-orange, sublimable solid. As a stable aminoxyl radical, it has applications in chemistry and biochemistry. TEMPO is used as a radical marker, as a structural probe for biological systems in conjunction with electron spin resonance spectroscopy, as a reagent in organic synthesis, and as a mediator in controlled radical polymerization.

== Preparation ==
TEMPO was discovered by Lebedev and Kazarnowskii in 1959 or 1960. It is prepared by oxidation of 2,2,6,6-tetramethylpiperidine.

== Structure and bonding ==
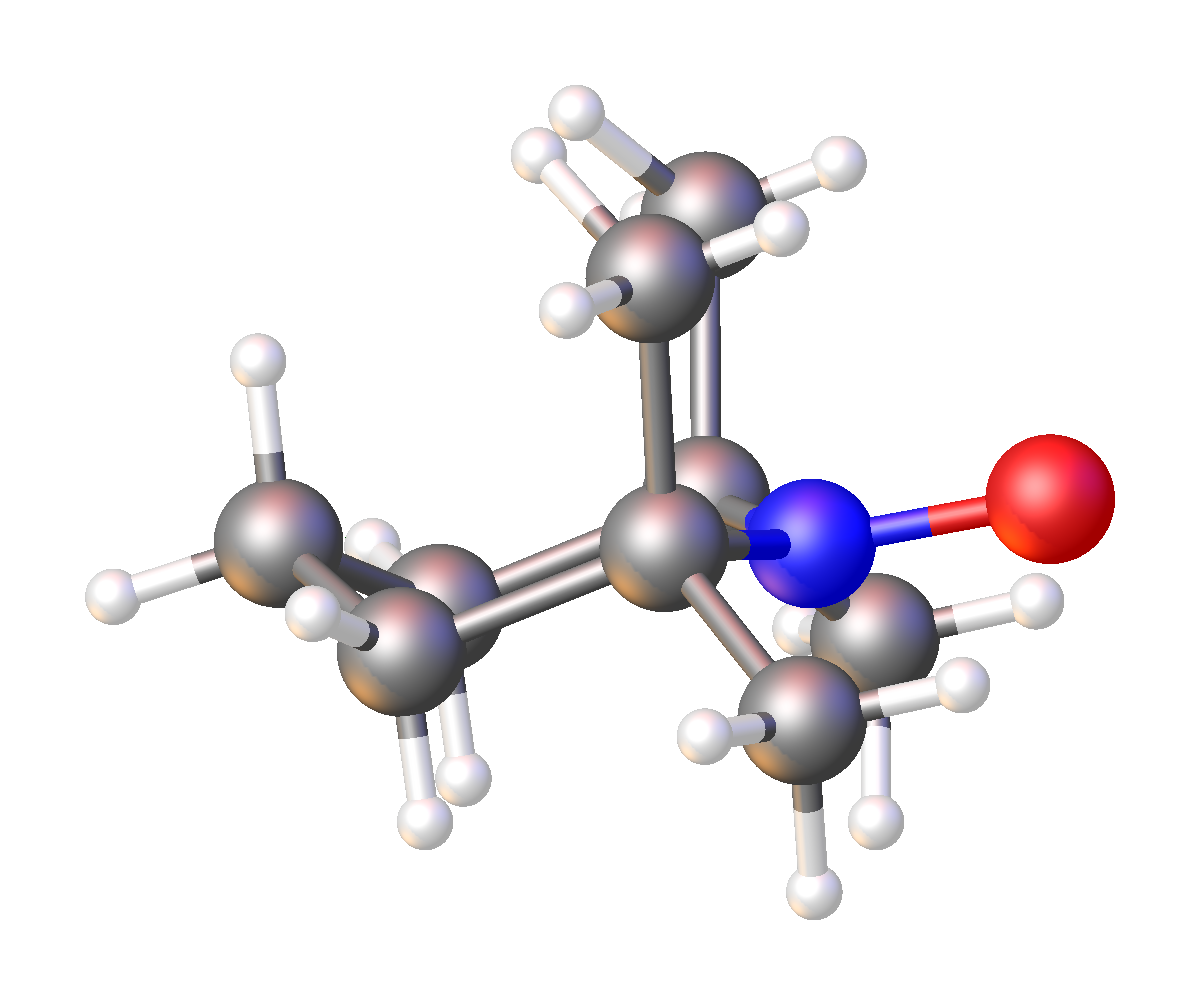
Structure of TEMPO. The N–O distance is 1.284 Å..

The structure has been confirmed by X-ray crystallography. The reactive radical is well shielded by the four methyl groups.

The stability of this radical can be attributed to the delocalization of the radical to form a two-center three-electron N–O bond. The stability is reminiscent of the stability of nitric oxide and nitrogen dioxide. Additional stability is attributed to the steric protection provided by the four methyl groups adjacent to the aminoxyl group. These methyl groups serve as inert substituents, whereas any CH center adjacent to the aminoxyl would be subject to abstraction by the aminoxyl.

Regardless of the reasons for the stability of the radical, the O–H bond in the hydrogenated derivative (the hydroxylamine 1-hydroxy-2,2,6,6-tetramethylpiperidine) TEMPO–H is weak. With an O–H bond dissociation energy of about 70 kcal/mol (290 kJ/mol), this bond is about 30% weaker than a typical O–H bond.

== Application in organic synthesis ==
TEMPO is employed in organic synthesis as a catalyst for the oxidation of primary alcohols to aldehydes. The actual oxidant is the N-oxoammonium salt, formed from TEMPO by another oxidant. The byprouct of the oxidation of the alcohol is a hydroxylamine, which can be re-oxidized to TEMPO, taking further advantage of the stoichiometric oxidant.

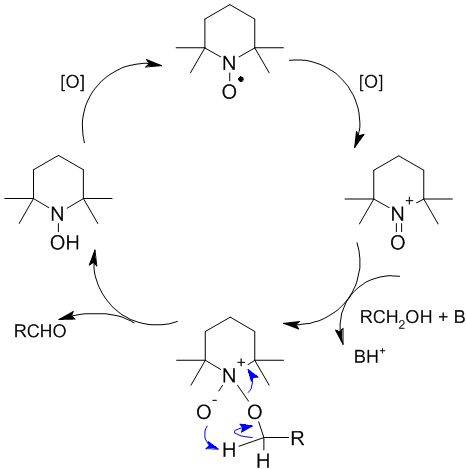

One typical reaction example is the oxidation of (S)-(−)-2-methyl-1-butanol to (S)-(+)-2-methylbutanal: Successive oxidation from primary alcohols to aldehydes and then further to carboxylic acids is possible, depending on reaction conditions. For example, 4-methoxyphenethyl alcohol is oxidized to 4-methoxyphenylacetic acid in a system of catalytic TEMPO and sodium hypochlorite and a stoichiometric amount of sodium chlorite.

TEMPO oxidations also exhibit chemoselectivity. In basic conditions, TEMPO oxidizes primary alcohols before secondary alcohols. But in acid, secondary alcohols provide an H^{−} ion more easily, and oxidize first instead.

In cases where secondary oxidizing agents cause side reactions of the alcohol, it is possible to stoichiometrically convert TEMPO to the oxoammonium salt in a separate step. For example, in the oxidation of geraniol to geranial, 4-acetamido-TEMPO is first oxidized to the oxoammonium tetrafluoroborate.

TEMPO can also be employed in nitroxide-mediated radical polymerization (NMP), a controlled free radical polymerization technique that allows better control over the final molecular weight distribution. The TEMPO free radical can be added to the end of a growing polymer chain, creating a "dormant" chain that stops polymerizing. However, the linkage between the polymer chain and TEMPO is weak, and can be broken upon heating, which then allows the polymerization to continue. Thus, the chemist can control the extent of polymerization and also synthesize narrowly distributed polymer chains.

== Industrial applications and analogues ==
TEMPO is sufficiently inexpensive for use on a laboratory scale. There is also industrial-scale manufacturer which can provide TEMPO at a reasonable price in large quantity. Structurally related analogues do exist, which are largely based on 4-hydroxy-TEMPO (TEMPOL). This is produced from acetone and ammonia, via triacetone amine, making it much less expensive. Other alternatives include polymer-supported TEMPO catalysts, which are economic due to their recyclability.

Industrial-scale examples of TEMPO-like compounds include hindered amine light stabilizers and polymerisation inhibitors.

== See also ==
- 1-Hydroxy-2,2,6,6-tetramethylpiperidine, the reduced derivative of TEMPO
- TEMPOL
- Bobbitt's salt
- N-Hydroxyphthalimide
