= Nitrone =

Chemical group (>C=N(O)–)

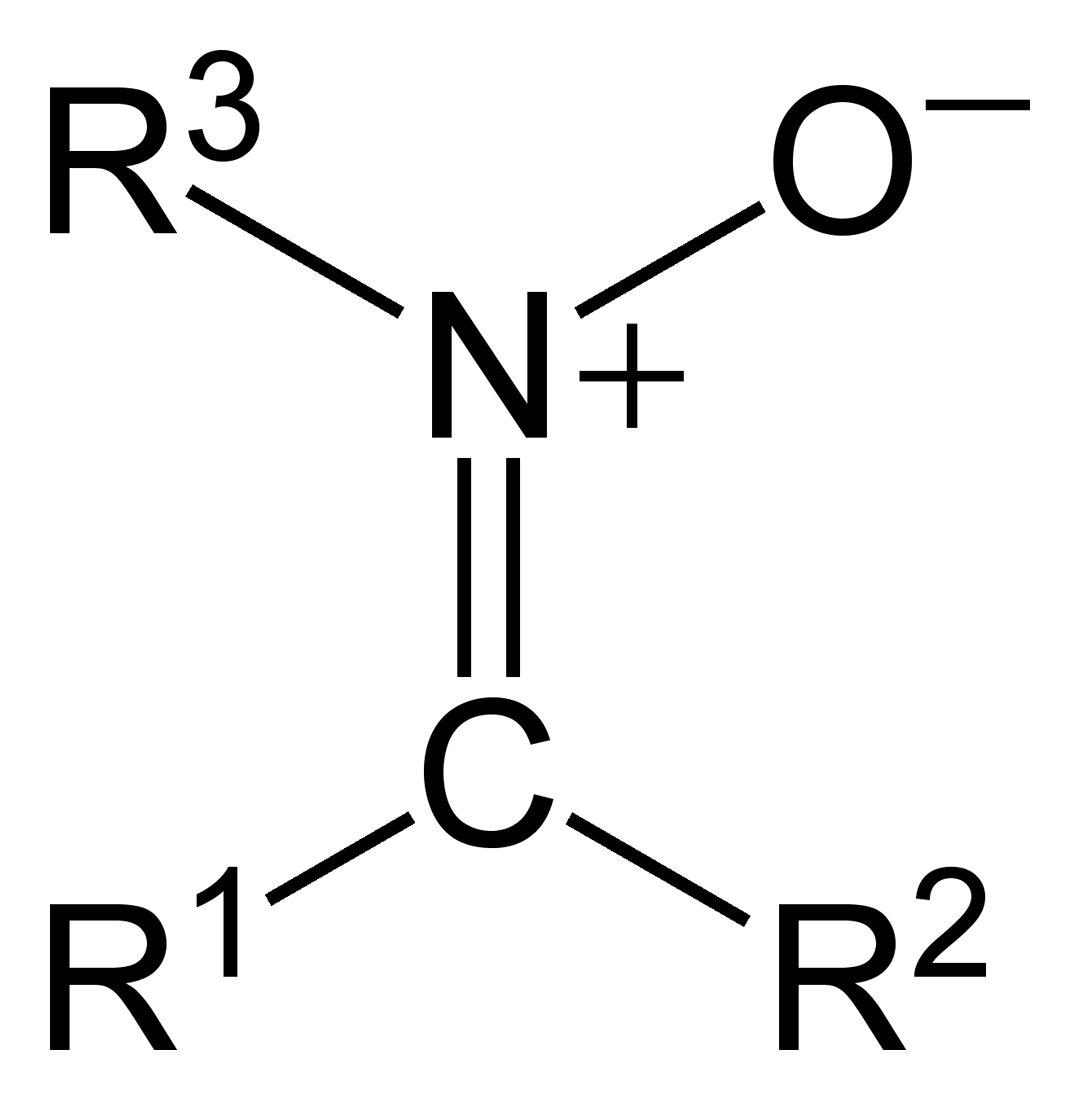
General structure of a nitrone.

In organic chemistry, a nitrone is a functional group consisting of an N-oxide of an imine. The general structure is R^{1}R^{2}C=N^{+}(−O^{−})(−R^{3}), where R^{3} is not a hydrogen. Their primary application is intermediates in chemical synthesis. A nitrone is a 1,3-dipole used in cycloadditions, and a carbonyl mimic.

== Structure ==
Nitrones, as a tetrasubstituted double bond, admit cis–trans isomerism.

== Generation of nitrones ==
Typical nitrone sources are hydroxylamine oxidation or condensation with carbonyl compounds. Secondary hydroxylamines oxidize to nitrones in air over a timescale of several weeks, accelerated by cupric salts.

The most general reagent used for the oxidation of hydroxylamines is aqueous mercuric oxide:

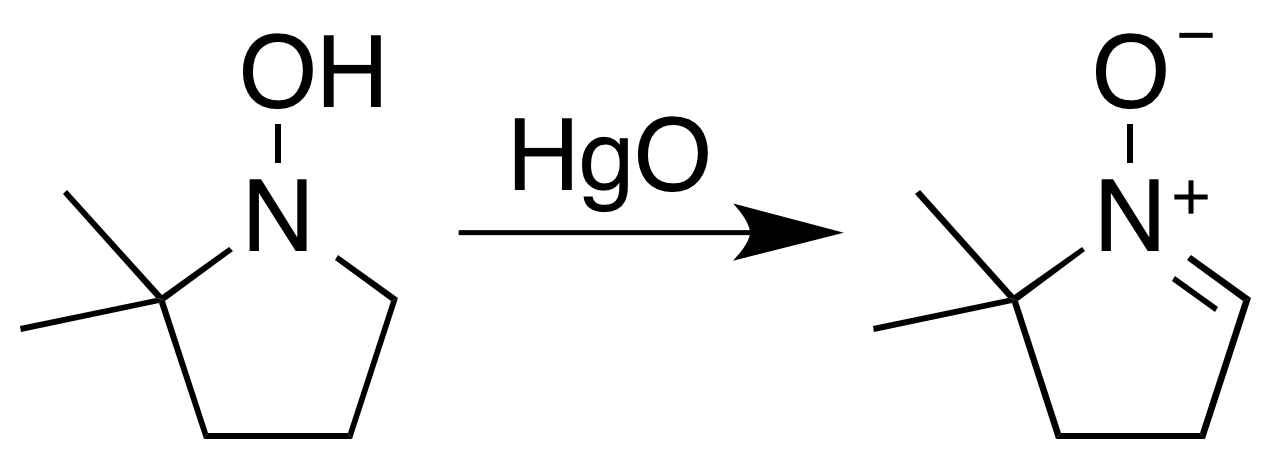

However, a hydroxylamine with two α hydrogens may unsaturate on either side. Carbonyl condensation avoids this ambiguity...

...but is inhibited if both ketone substituents are bulky.

In principle, N-alkylation could produce nitrones from oximes, but in practice electrophiles typically perform a mixture of N- and O-attack.

== Reactions ==
Some nitrones oligomerize:

Syntheses with nitrone precursors obviate the issue with increased temperature, to exaggerate entropic factors; or with a nitrone excess.

=== Carbonyl mimic ===
Like many other unsaturated functional groups, nitrones activate the α and β carbons towards reaction. The α carbon is an electrophile and the β carbon a nucleophile; that is, nitrones polarize like carbonyls and nitriles but unlike nitro compounds and vinyl sulfur derivatives.

Nitrones hydrolyze extremely easily to the corresponding carbonyl and N-hydroxylamine.

=== 1,3-dipolar cycloadditions ===
As 1,3‑dipoles, nitrones perform [3+2] cycloadditions. For example, a dipolarophilic alkene combines to form isoxazolidine:

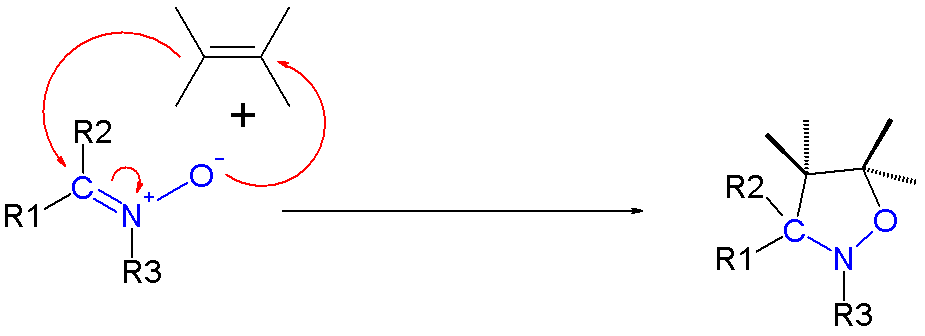
Nitrone cycloadditions

Other ring-closing reactions are known, including formal [3+3] and [5+2] cycloadditions.

=== Isomerization ===
Deoxygenating reagents, light, or heat all catalyze rearrangement to the amide. Acids catalyze rearrangement to the oxime ether.

=== Reduction ===
Hydrides add to give hydroxylamines. Reducing Lewis acids (e.g. metals, SO_{2}) deoxygenate to the imine instead.

== See also ==
- N-Oxoammonium salt
- Nitronate
