= Phorone =

Chemical compound

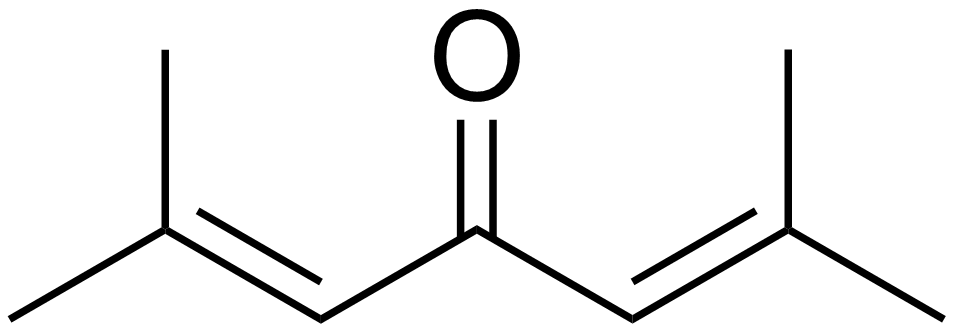

Names
- Preferred IUPAC name 2,6-Dimethylhepta-2,5-dien-4-one
- Other names Phorone; Diisopropylidene acetone

Identifiers
CAS Number	504-20-1
3D model (JSmol)	Interactive image
ChEBI	CHEBI:35572
ChEMBL	ChEMBL2766015
ChemSpider	10007
ECHA InfoCard	100.007.261
EC Number	207-986-3
PubChem CID	10438
RTECS number	MI5500000
UNII	8F20OEI0MV
UN number	1993
CompTox Dashboard (EPA)	DTXSID1021584
- InChI: InChI=1S/C9H14O/c1-7(2)5-9(10)6-8(3)4/h5-6H,1-4H3 Key: MTZWHHIREPJPTG-UHFFFAOYSA-N; InChI=1/C9H14O/c1-7(2)5-9(10)6-8(3)4/h5-6H,1-4H3 Key: MTZWHHIREPJPTG-UHFFFAOYAY
- SMILES: O=C(C=C(C)C)C=C(C)C

Properties
Chemical formula	((CH_{3})_{2}C=CH)_{2}C=O
Molar mass	138.210 g·mol^{−1}
Appearance	Yellow crystals
Odor	Geranium
Density	0.885 g/cm^{3}
Melting point	28 °C (82 °F; 301 K)
Boiling point	198 to 199 °C (388 to 390 °F; 471 to 472 K)

Hazards
Flash point	79 °C (174 °F; 352 K)
Safety data sheet (SDS)	External MSDS
- Except where otherwise noted, data are given for materials in their standard state (at 25 °C [77 °F], 100 kPa). verify (what is ?) Infobox references

Phorone, or diisopropylidene acetone, is a yellow crystalline substance with a geranium odor, with formula C_{9}H_{14}O or ((CH_{3})_{2}C=CH)_{2}C=O.

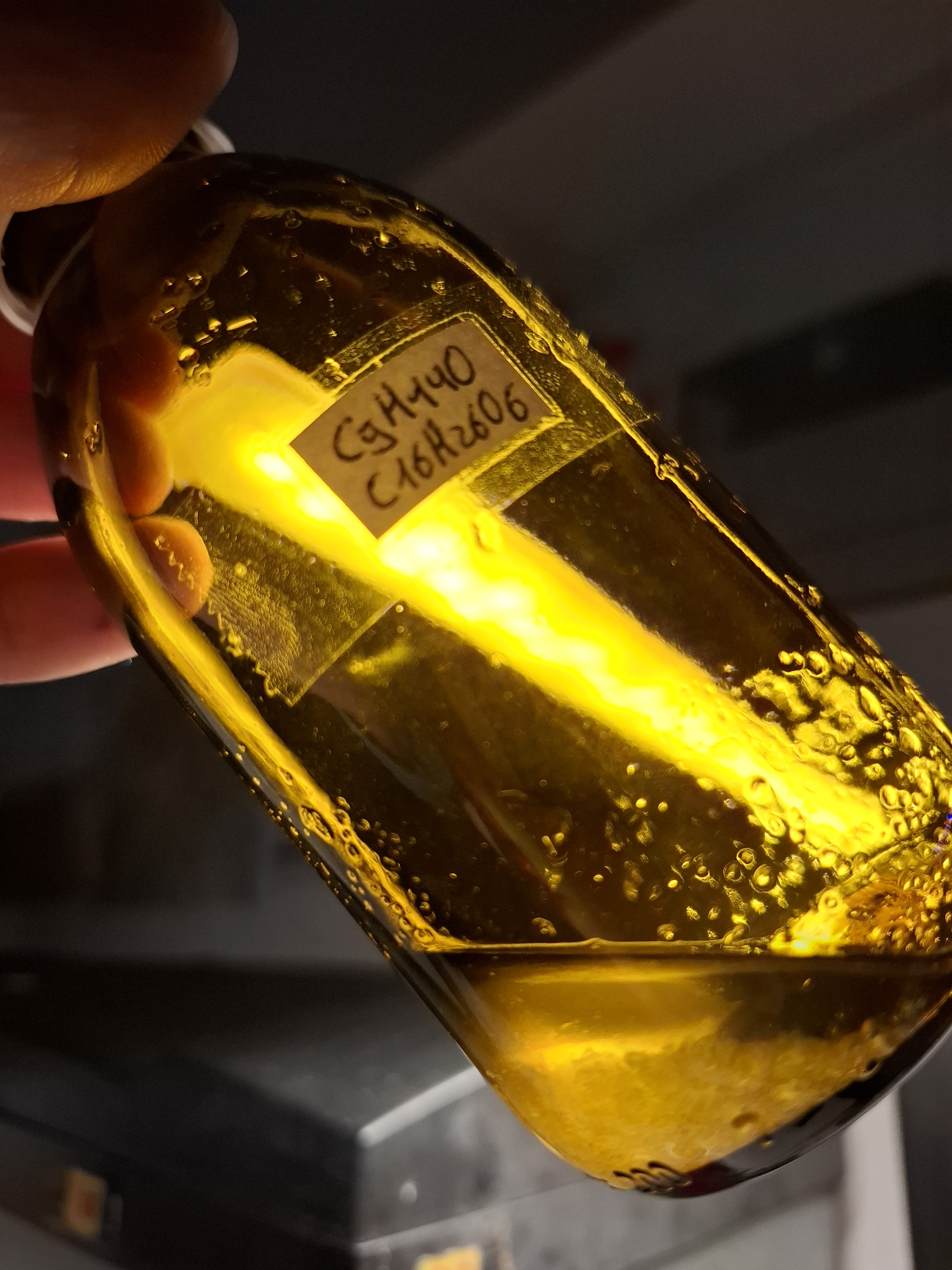
Phorone from aldol condensation of acetone. Some crystals are at the bottom, some C9H14O is in its oily liquid.

== Preparation ==
It was first obtained in 1837 in impure form by the French chemist Auguste Laurent, who called it "camphoryle". In 1849, the French chemist Charles Frédéric Gerhardt and his student Jean Pierre Liès-Bodart prepared it in a pure state and named it "phorone". On both occasions it was produced by ketonization through the dry distillation of the calcium salt of camphoric acid.

CaC_{10}H_{14}O_{4} → C_{9}H_{14}O + CaCO_{3}

It is now typically obtained by the acid-catalysed twofold aldol condensation of three molecules of acetone. Mesityl oxide is obtained as an intermediate and can be isolated.

Crude phorone can be purified by repeated recrystallization from ethanol or ether, in which it is soluble.

== Reactions ==
Phorone can condense with ammonia to form triacetone amine.

== See also ==
- Isophorone
