= 6PPD =

Organic chemical used in rubber tires

Names
- Preferred IUPAC name N^{1}-(4-Methylpentan-2-yl)-N^{4}-phenylbenzene-1,4-diamine
- Other names N-(1,3-dimethylbutyl)-N'-phenyl-1,4-benzenediamine: N-(1,3-dimethylbutyl)-N'-phenyl-p-phenylenediamine; 6PPD; HPPD; DMBPPD

Identifiers
CAS Number	793-24-8
3D model (JSmol)	Interactive image
ChEMBL	ChEMBL1558796
ChemSpider	12553
ECHA InfoCard	100.011.222
EC Number	212-344-0
PubChem CID	13101
UNII	HJD0U67PS1
UN number	3077
CompTox Dashboard (EPA)	DTXSID9025114
- InChI: InChI=1S/C18H24N2/c1-14(2)13-15(3)19-17-9-11-18(12-10-17)20-16-7-5-4-6-8-16/h4-12,14-15,19-20H,13H2,1-3H3 Key: ZZMVLMVFYMGSMY-UHFFFAOYSA-N
- SMILES: CC(C)CC(C)NC1=CC=C(C=C1)NC2=CC=CC=C2

Properties
Chemical formula	C_{18}H_{24}N_{2}
Molar mass	268.404 g·mol^{−1}
Appearance	brown or violet solid powder
Density	1.07
Melting point	45 °C (113 °F; 318 K)
Boiling point	260 °C (500 °F; 533 K)
log P	3.972

Hazards
- GHS labelling
Pictograms	(GHS07: Exclamation mark) (GHS08: Health hazard) (GHS09: Environmental hazard)
Signal word	Danger
Hazard statements	H302, H317, H360, H410
Precautionary statements	P201, P202, P261, P264, P270, P272, P273, P280, P281, P301+P312, P302+P352, P308+P313, P321, P330, P333+P313, P363, P391, P405, P501
Flash point	204 °C (399 °F; 477 K)
- Except where otherwise noted, data are given for materials in their standard state (at 25 °C [77 °F], 100 kPa). Infobox references

6PPD is an organic chemical widely used as stabilising additive (or antidegradant) in rubbers, such as natural rubber, styrene-butadiene and butyl rubber; all of which are common in vehicle tires. Although it is an effective antioxidant, it is primarily used because of its excellent antiozonant performance. It is one of several antiozonants based around p-phenylenediamine.

It has been used in rubber since the late 1970s, but has been the subject of increasing scrutiny since 2021, when it was determined that its oxidation product (6PPD-Q) causes pre-spawn mortality in coho salmon.

== Manufacturing ==
6PPD is prepared by reductive amination of methyl isobutyl ketone (which has six carbon atoms, hence the '6' in the name) with phenyl phenylenediamine (PPD). This produces a racemic mixture.

== Application ==
6PPD is a common rubber antiozonant found in vehicle tires. It is mobile within the rubber and slowly migrates to the surface via blooming. On the surface it forms a "scavenger-protective film" that reacts with the ozone more quickly than the ozone can react with the rubber. This process forms aminoxyl radicals and was first thought to degrade only to the quinone diimine, but has since been understood to continue to oxidize to quinones, amongst other products. Despite 6PPD being used in tires since the mid 1970s, its transformation to quinones was first recognized in 2020. The oxidized products are not effective antiozonants, meaning that 6PPD is a sacrificial agent.

The tendency of 6PPD to bloom towards the surface is protective because the surface film of antiozonant is replenished from reserves held within the rubber. However, this same property facilitates the transfer of 6PPD and its oxidation products into the environment as tire-wear debris. The 6PPD-quinone (6PPD-Q, CAS RN: 2754428-18-5) is of particular and increasing concern, due to its toxicity to fish.

== Environmental impact ==
6PPD and 6PPD-quinone enter the environment through tire-wear particles and are sufficiently water-soluble to enter river systems via urban runoff. From here they become widely distributed (at decreasing levels) from urban rivers through estuaries, coasts and finally deep-sea areas.

6PPD-quinone is of environmental concern because it is toxic to coho salmon, killing them before they spawn in freshwater streams.

A 2022 study also identified the toxic impact on species like brook trout and rainbow trout. The published lethal concentrations are:

- coho salmon: LC_{50} = 0.095 μg/L
- brook trout: LC_{50} = 0.59 μg/L
- rainbow trout: LC_{50} = 1.0 μg/L

It is not known why the ozone-oxidised 6PPD is toxic to coho salmon, but has been suggested that the large differences in lethal dose between species may relate to their ability to rid themselves of 6PPD-Q via glucuronidation. The Nisqually and nonprofit Long Live the Kings installed a mobile stormwater filter at a bridge in the Ohop Valley in 2022. The Washington Department of Ecology, Washington State University and the US Tire Manufacturer's Association are working on regulation and education.

6PPD itself is deadly to rotifers, especially in combination with sodium chloride, though not at the level generally found in the runoff from road salt. A small-scale biomonitoring study in South China has shown both 6PPD and 6PPDQ to be present in human urine; concentrations were low but the health implications are unknown. A synthetic route to the 6PPD-quinone has been posted on ChemRxiv.

== See also ==
- N-Isopropyl-N'-phenyl-1,4-phenylenediamine (IPPD), a related antiozonant
- N,N'-Di-2-butyl-1,4-phenylenediamine, a phenylenediamine-based antioxidant used as a fuel additive
