= N-Isopropyl-N'-phenyl-1,4-phenylenediamine =

N-Isopropyl-N′-phenyl-1,4-phenylenediamine

Names
- Preferred IUPAC name N^{1}-Phenyl-N^{4}-(propan-2-yl)benzene-1,4-diamine
- Other names: 4-Isopropylaminodiphenylamine; Flexzone 3C; Nonox 3C; Rhenogran IPPD-80; Santoflex IPPD; Vanox 3C; Vulkanox 4010

Identifiers
CAS Number	101-72-4
3D model (JSmol)	Interactive image
ChEMBL	ChEMBL1449018
ChemSpider	7292
ECHA InfoCard	100.002.700
EC Number	202-969-7
PubChem CID	7573
RTECS number	ST2650000
UNII	0M7PSL4100
UN number	1673
CompTox Dashboard (EPA)	DTXSID1025485
- InChI: InChI=1S/C15H18N2/c1-12(2)16-14-8-10-15(11-9-14)17-13-6-4-3-5-7-13/h3-12,16-17H,1-2H3 Key: OUBMGJOQLXMSNT-UHFFFAOYSA-N
- SMILES: CC(C)NC1=CC=C(C=C1)NC2=CC=CC=C2

Properties
Chemical formula	C_{15}H_{18}N_{2}
Molar mass	226.323 g·mol^{−1}
Appearance	dark grey flakes
Density	1.04
Melting point	75 °C (167 °F; 348 K)

Hazards
- GHS labelling
Pictograms	(GHS07: Exclamation mark) (GHS08: Health hazard) (GHS09: Environmental hazard)
Signal word	Danger
Hazard statements	H302, H317, H320, H371, H372, H373, H410
Precautionary statements	P260, P264, P270, P272, P273, P280, P301+P312, P302+P352, P305+P351+P338, P309+P311, P314, P321, P330, P333+P313, P337+P313, P363, P391, P405, P501
- Except where otherwise noted, data are given for materials in their standard state (at 25 °C [77 °F], 100 kPa). Infobox references

N-Isopropyl-N′-phenyl-1,4-phenylenediamine (often abbreviated IPPD) is an organic compound commonly used as an antiozonant in rubbers. Like other p-phenylenediamine-based antiozonants it works by virtue of its low ionization energy, which allows it to react with ozone faster than ozone will react with rubber. This reaction converts it to the corresponding aminoxyl radical (R_{2}N–O•), with the ozone being converted to a hydroperoxyl radical (HOO•), these species can then be scavenged by other antioxidant polymer stabilizers.

IPPD is prone to process called blooming, where it migrates to the surface of the rubber. This can be beneficial to the tire, as ozone attacks the tire surface and blooming therefore moves the antiozonant to where it is most needed, however this also increases the leaching of IPPD into the environment. Many tire producers have moved to using 6PPD instead, as this migrates more slowly. Oxidation of IPPD converts the central phenylenediamine ring into a quinone.

== Safety ==
IPPD is a human allergen. It is the compound responsible for coining the term "Volkswagen Dermatitis". There is some preliminary evidence for it being harmful to fish.

== See also ==
- N,N′-Di-2-butyl-1,4-phenylenediamine - a phenylenediamine based antioxidant used as a fuel additive
