= Methyl isobutyl ketone =

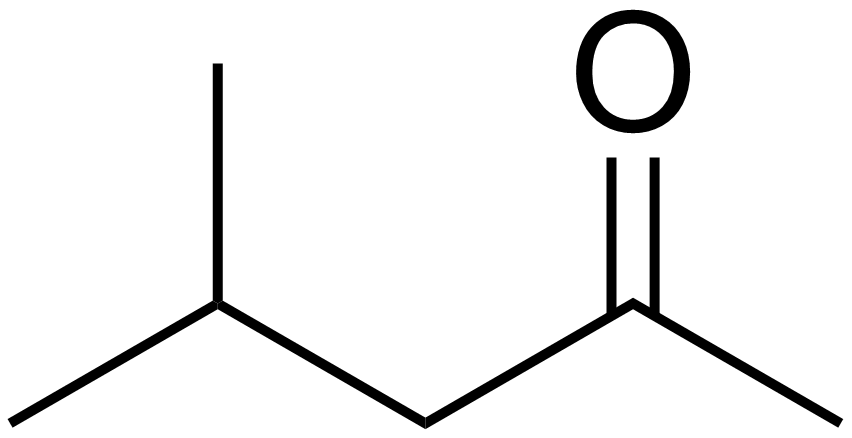

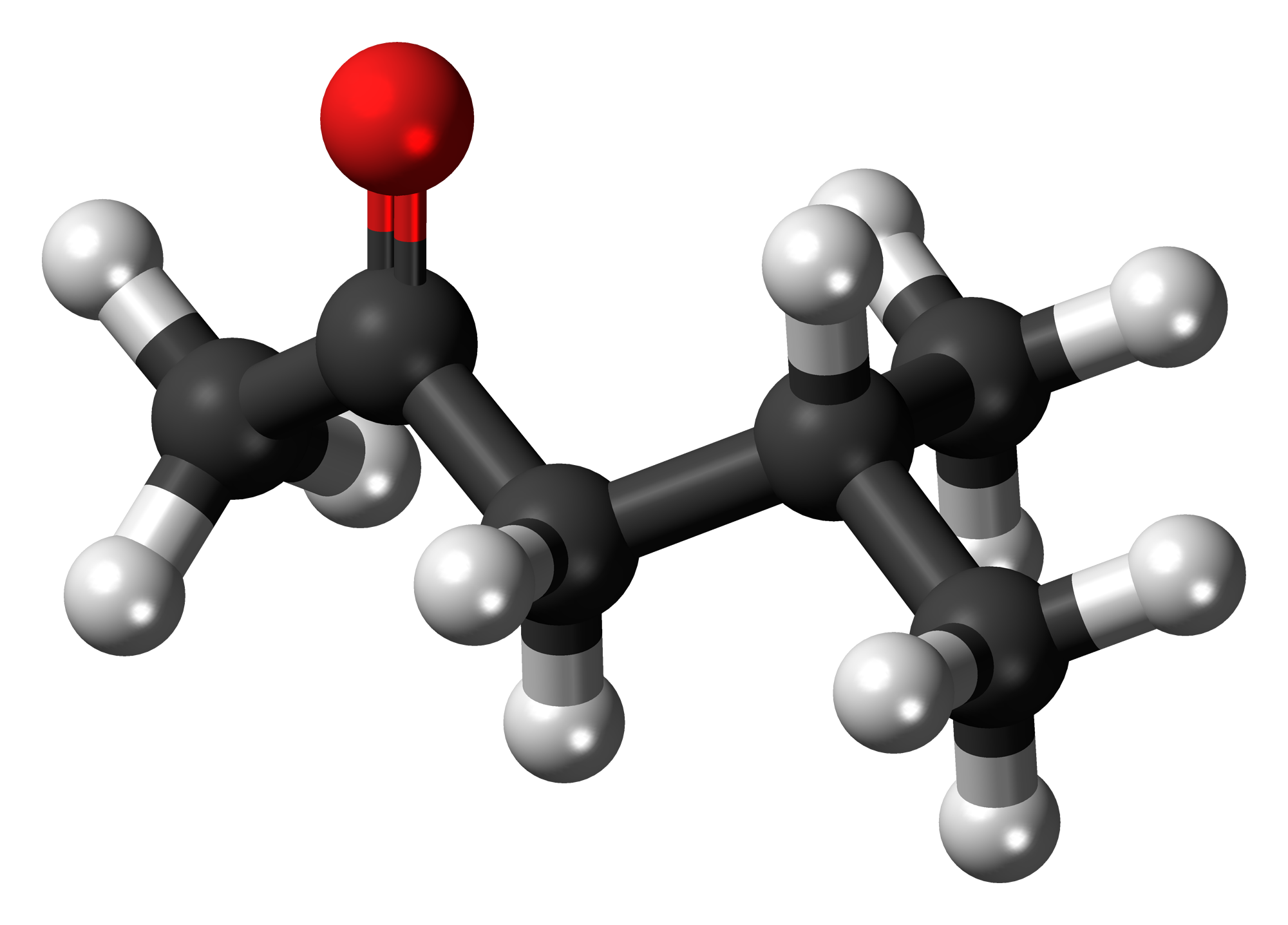

Names
- Preferred IUPAC name 4-Methylpentan-2-one
- Other names: 4-Methyl-2-pentanone; Isopropylacetone; Hexone; Isobutyl methyl ketone; 2-Methylpropyl methyl ketone; 4-Methyl-2-oxopentane; Isobutylmethyl ketone; Isohexanone

Identifiers
CAS Number	108-10-1
3D model (JSmol)	Interactive image
Abbreviations	MIBK
ChEBI	CHEBI:82344
ChEMBL	ChEMBL285323
ChemSpider	7621
ECHA InfoCard	100.003.228
EC Number	203-550-1
KEGG	C19263
PubChem CID	7909
RTECS number	SA9275000
UNII	U5T7B88CNP
UN number	1245
CompTox Dashboard (EPA)	DTXSID5021889
- InChI: InChI=1S/C6H12O/c1-5(2)4-6(3)7/h5H,4H2,1-3H3 Key: NTIZESTWPVYFNL-UHFFFAOYSA-N; InChI=1/C6H12O/c1-5(2)4-6(3)7/h5H,4H2,1-3H3 Key: NTIZESTWPVYFNL-UHFFFAOYAQ
- SMILES: CC(C)CC(=O)C

Properties
Chemical formula	C_{6}H_{12}O
Molar mass	100.161 g·mol^{−1}
Appearance	colorless liquid
Density	0.7965 g/mL
Melting point	−85 °C (−121 °F; 188 K)
Boiling point	115.7 °C (240.3 °F; 388.8 K)
Critical point (T, P)	575.4 K, 3.4 MPa
Solubility in water	1.91 g/100 mL (20.0 °C (68.0 °F; 293.1 K))
Solubility	miscible with acetone, benzene, ethanol, ether; soluble in chloroform
log P	1.31
Vapor pressure	2.64 kPa
Magnetic susceptibility (χ)	−69.7×10^{−6} cm^{3}/mol
Refractive index (n_{D})	1.3962
Viscosity	0.545 cP

Thermochemistry
Heat capacity (C)	213.3 J⋅mol^{−1}·K^{-1}
Enthalpy of vaporization (Δ_{f}H_{vap})	40.61 kJ⋅mol^{−1}

Hazards
- GHS labelling
Pictograms	(GHS02: Flammable) (GHS07: Exclamation mark) (GHS08: Health hazard)
Signal word	Danger
Hazard statements	H225, H319, H332, H336, H351
Precautionary statements	P201, P202, P210, P233, P240, P241, P242, P243, P261, P264, P271, P280, P303+P361+P353, P304+P340+P312, P305+P351+P338, P308+P313, P337+P313, P370+P378, P403+P233, P403+P235, P405, P501
NFPA 704 (fire diamond)	2 3 1
Flash point	18 °C (64 °F; 291 K)
Autoignition temperature	448 °C (838 °F; 721 K)
Explosive limits	1.2%–8.0%
Threshold limit value (TLV)	20 ppm (TWA), 75 ppm (STEL)
- Lethal dose or concentration (LD, LC)
LD_{50} (median dose)	2080 mg/kg (oral, rat)
LC_{50} (median concentration)	11.6 mg/L (4h, rat, vapor)
- NIOSH (US health exposure limits)
PEL (Permissible)	TWA 100 ppm (410 mg/m^{3})
REL (Recommended)	TWA 50 ppm (205 mg/m^{3}); ST 75 ppm ppm (300 mg/m^{3})
IDLH (Immediate danger)	500 ppm

Related compounds
Related ketones	Acetone; Methyl isopropyl ketone; 2-Pentanone
- Except where otherwise noted, data are given for materials in their standard state (at 25 °C [77 °F], 100 kPa). verify (what is ?) Infobox references

Methyl isobutyl ketone (MIBK, 4-methylpentan-2-one) is an organic compound with the condensed chemical formula (CH_{3})_{2}CHCH_{2}C(O)CH_{3}. This ketone is a colourless liquid that is used as a solvent for gums, resins, paints, varnishes, lacquers, and nitrocellulose.

== Production ==
At laboratory scale, MIBK can be produced via a three-step process using acetone as the starting material. Self-condensation, a type of aldol reaction, produces diacetone alcohol, which readily dehydrates to give 4-methylpent-3-en-2-one (commonly, mesityl oxide). Mesityl oxide is then hydrogenated to give MIBK.

Industrially, these three steps are combined. Acetone is treated with a strongly acidic, palladium catalyst-doped cation exchange resin under medium pressure of hydrogen. Several million kilograms are produced annually.

== Uses ==
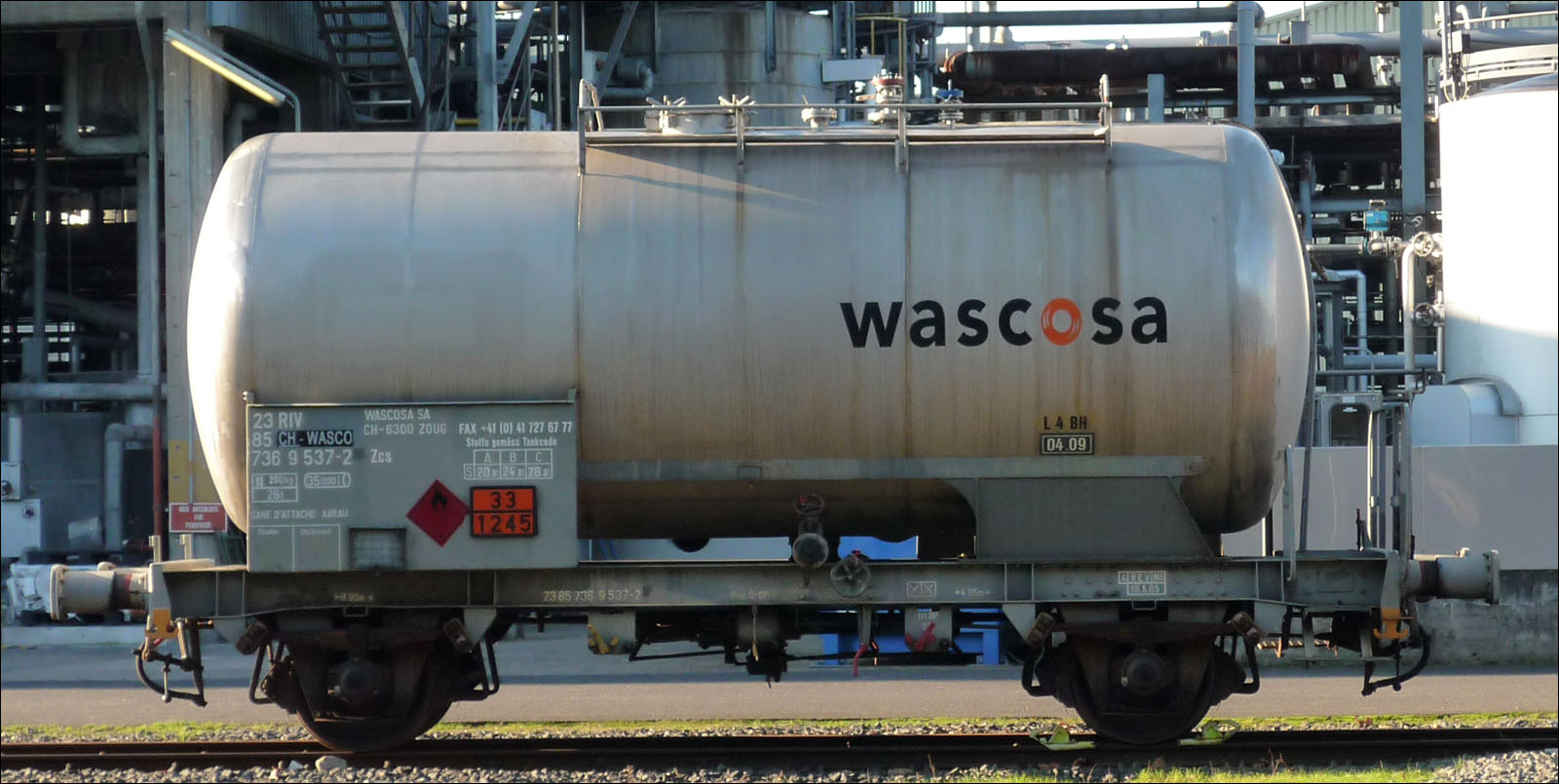
MIBK tank car in Europe.

MIBK is used as a solvent for nitrocellulose, lacquers, and certain polymers and resins.

=== Precursor to 6PPD ===
Another major use is as a precursor to N-(1,3-dimethylbutyl)-N′-phenyl-p-phenylene diamine (6PPD), an antiozonant used in tires. 6PPD is prepared by reductive coupling of MIBK with 4-aminodiphenylamine.

=== Solvent and niche applications ===
Unlike the other common ketone solvents, acetone and MEK, MIBK has quite low solubility in water, making it useful for liquid-liquid extraction. For example, the purification of tantalum from its ores often relies on MIBK extractions. It has a similar polarity to ethyl acetate, but greater stability towards aqueous acids and bases.

It can be used to extract gold, silver and other precious metals from cyanide solutions, such as those used in gold mines, to determine the levels of those dissolved metals.

When mixed with water or isopropyl alcohol MIBK serves as a developer for PMMA electron beam lithography resist. MIBK is used as a solvent for CS in the preparation of the CS spray used currently by American and British police forces.
