= Acetone (disambiguation) =

Acetone is an organic solvent.

Acetone may also refer to:

- Acetone peroxide, an organic high explosive
- Ace Tone, a manufacturer of musical instruments
- Acetone (band), an alternative rock band
- "Acetone", a song from the album Legion of Boom by The Crystal Method
- Acetone (data page)
