= C12H12N2 =

The molecular formula C_{12}H_{12}N_{2} (molar mass: 184.24 g/mol) may refer to:

- Benzidine
- Diquat (C_{12}H_{12}N_{2}^{2+})
- Hydrazobenzene
- 4-Aminodiphenylamine
- Dimethyl-2,2'-bipyridine
  - Abametapir (5,5'-Dimethyl-2,2'-bipyridine)
