= Diacetonamine =

Chemical compound

Names
- Other names 4-Amino-4-methylpentan-2-one

Identifiers
CAS Number	625-04-7
3D model (JSmol)	Interactive image
ChemSpider	62570
ECHA InfoCard	100.009.888
EC Number	210-876-8
PubChem CID	69361
UNII	WI13YZU3HT
CompTox Dashboard (EPA)	DTXSID3060798
- InChI: InChI=1S/C6H13NO/c1-5(8)4-6(2,3)7/h4,7H2,1-3H3 Key: CQTRUFMMCCOKTA-UHFFFAOYSA-N
- SMILES: CC(=O)CC(C)(C)N

Properties
Chemical formula	C_{6}H_{13}NO
Molar mass	115.17 g/mol
Density	g/cm^{3} (20°C)
Boiling point	163 °C (325 °F; 436 K) at 12 mm Hg
- Except where otherwise noted, data are given for materials in their standard state (at 25 °C [77 °F], 100 kPa). Infobox references

Diacetonamine is a useful precursor in organic synthesis.

Diacetonamine and triacetonamine are formed in plant extracts:

Diacetonamine contains an acetyl group, a primary amine, and two methyl groups.

== Applications ==
It is known to have application in the synthesis of eucaine & alpha-eucaine.

Additionally it was used in the synthesis of [2104-81-6], an agent discovered by C. Robin Ganellin. This compound has central nervous system activity as a combination of a stimulant and a depressant. A narcotic pharmacophore was associated with the structure in an earlier work.

Another place that diacetonamine is used is in the synthesis of Eucatropine (euphtalmin) [100-91-4]. The synthesis route is via the precursor 2,2,6-trimethylpiperidin-4-one [3311-23-7]. This is the same chemical as was used in the synthesis of beta-eucaine (see above).

== Synthesis ==
It is formed by the conjugate addition of ammonia to mesityl oxide. Mesityl oxide itself is formed from the dehydration of diacetone alcohol. However, it can also be prepared directly from acetone without isolating the intermediate alcohol.

Diacetonamine synthesis.svg

It is claimed that diacetonamine can also be prepared by the direct reaction between ammonia and acetone. However, closer inspection of the literature reveals that different products are obtained from this reaction.
