= Mesityl oxide =

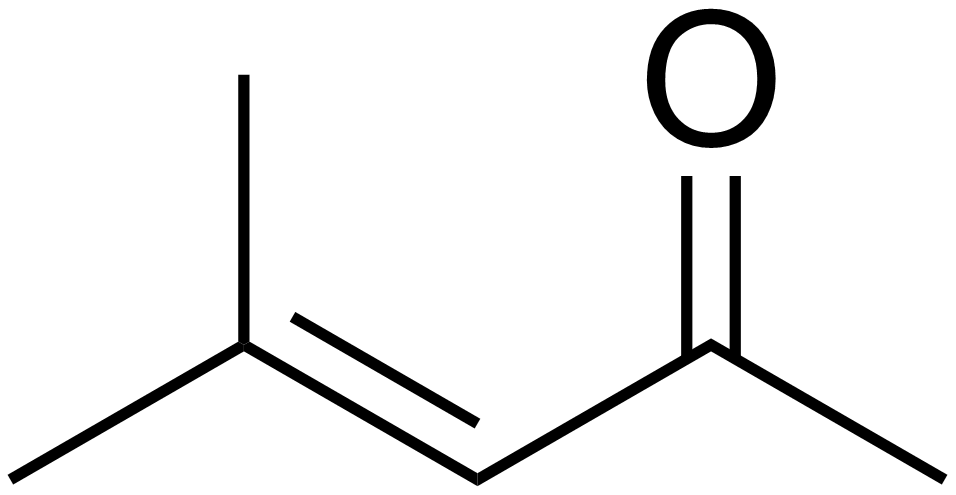
- Mesityl oxide

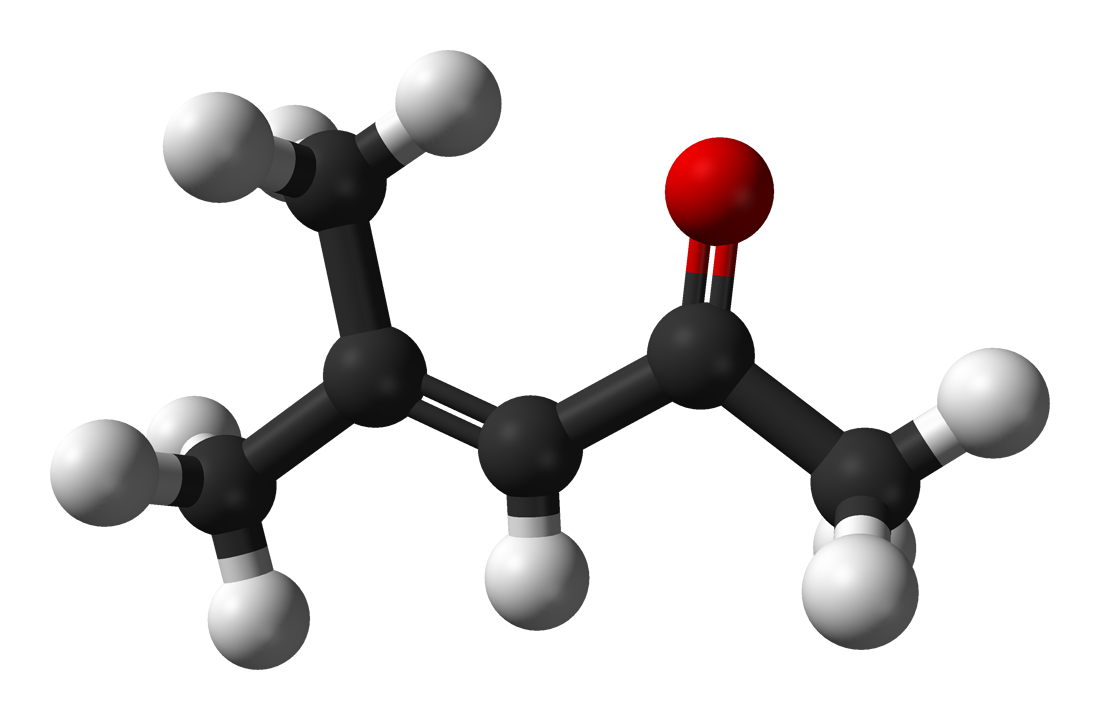

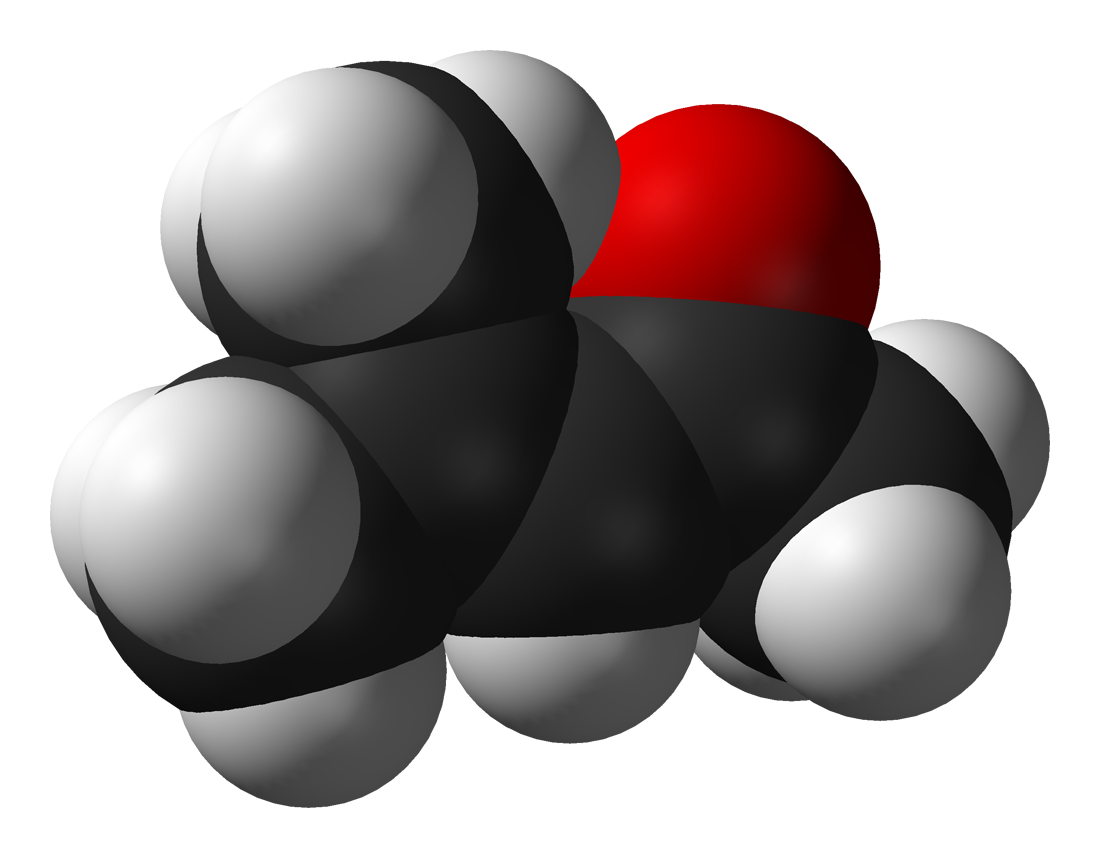

Names
- Preferred IUPAC name 4-Methylpent-3-en-2-one
- Other names Mesityl oxide Isobutenyl methyl ketone Methyl isobutenyl ketone Isopropylidene acetone

Identifiers
CAS Number	141-79-7
3D model (JSmol)	Interactive image
ChEBI	CHEBI:89993
ChEMBL	ChEMBL3185916
ChemSpider	8526
ECHA InfoCard	100.005.002
EC Number	205-502-5
PubChem CID	8858
RTECS number	SB4200000
UNII	77LAC84669
UN number	1229
CompTox Dashboard (EPA)	DTXSID1029170
- InChI: InChI=1S/C6H10O/c1-5(2)4-6(3)7/h4H,1-3H3 Key: SHOJXDKTYKFBRD-UHFFFAOYSA-N; InChI=1/C6H10O/c1-5(2)4-6(3)7/h4H,1-3H3
- SMILES: O=C(\C=C(/C)C)C

Properties
Chemical formula	C_{6}H_{10}O
Molar mass	98.145 g·mol^{−1}
Appearance	Oily, colorless to light-yellow liquid
Odor	peppermint- or honey-like
Density	0.858 g/cm^{3}
Melting point	−53 °C (−63 °F; 220 K)
Boiling point	129.5 °C (265.1 °F; 402.6 K)
Solubility in water	3% (20°C)
Solubility in other solvents	Soluble in most organic solvents
Vapor pressure	9 mmHg (20°C)
Refractive index (n_{D})	1.442

Hazards
- Occupational safety and health (OHS/OSH)
Main hazards	flammable
- GHS labelling
Pictograms	(GHS02: Flammable) (GHS07: Exclamation mark)
Signal word	Warning
Hazard statements	H226, H302, H312, H332
Precautionary statements	P210, P233, P240, P241, P242, P243, P261, P264, P270, P271, P280, P301+P312, P302+P352, P303+P361+P353, P304+P312, P304+P340, P312, P322, P330, P363, P370+P378, P403+P235, P501
Flash point	31 °C; 87 °F; 304 K
Explosive limits	1.4–7.2%
- Lethal dose or concentration (LD, LC)
LD_{50} (median dose)	1120 mg/kg (rat, oral); 1000 mg/kg (rabbit, oral); 710 mg/kg (mouse, oral)
LC_{50} (median concentration)	1000 mg/m^{3} (rat, 4 hr); 9000 mg/m^{3} (rat, 4 hr); 10,000 mg/m^{3} (mouse, 2 hr); 2000 mg/m^{3} (guinea pig, 7 hr)
- NIOSH (US health exposure limits)
PEL (Permissible)	TWA 25 ppm (100 mg/m^{3})
REL (Recommended)	TWA 10 ppm (40 mg/m^{3})
IDLH (Immediate danger)	1400 ppm

Related compounds
Related compounds	diacetone alcohol acetone, benzylideneacetone
- Except where otherwise noted, data are given for materials in their standard state (at 25 °C [77 °F], 100 kPa). verify (what is ?) Infobox references

Mesityl oxide is a α,β-unsaturated ketone with the formula CH_{3}C(O)CH=C(CH_{3})_{2}. This compound is a colorless, volatile liquid with a honey-like odor.

== Synthesis ==
It is prepared by the aldol condensation of acetone to give diacetone alcohol, which readily dehydrates to give this compound.

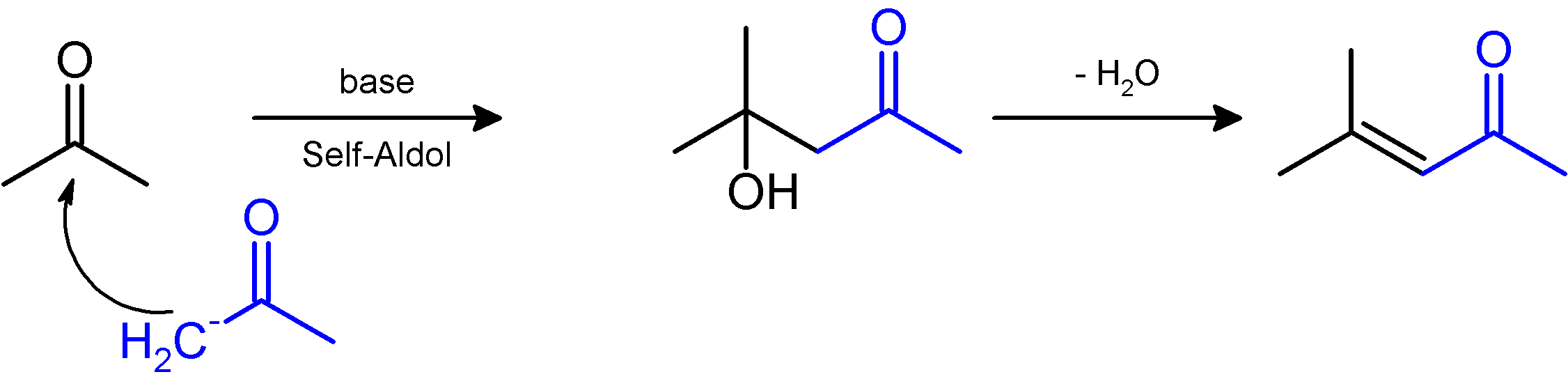

Phorone and isophorone may be formed under the same conditions. Isophorone originates via a Michael addition:

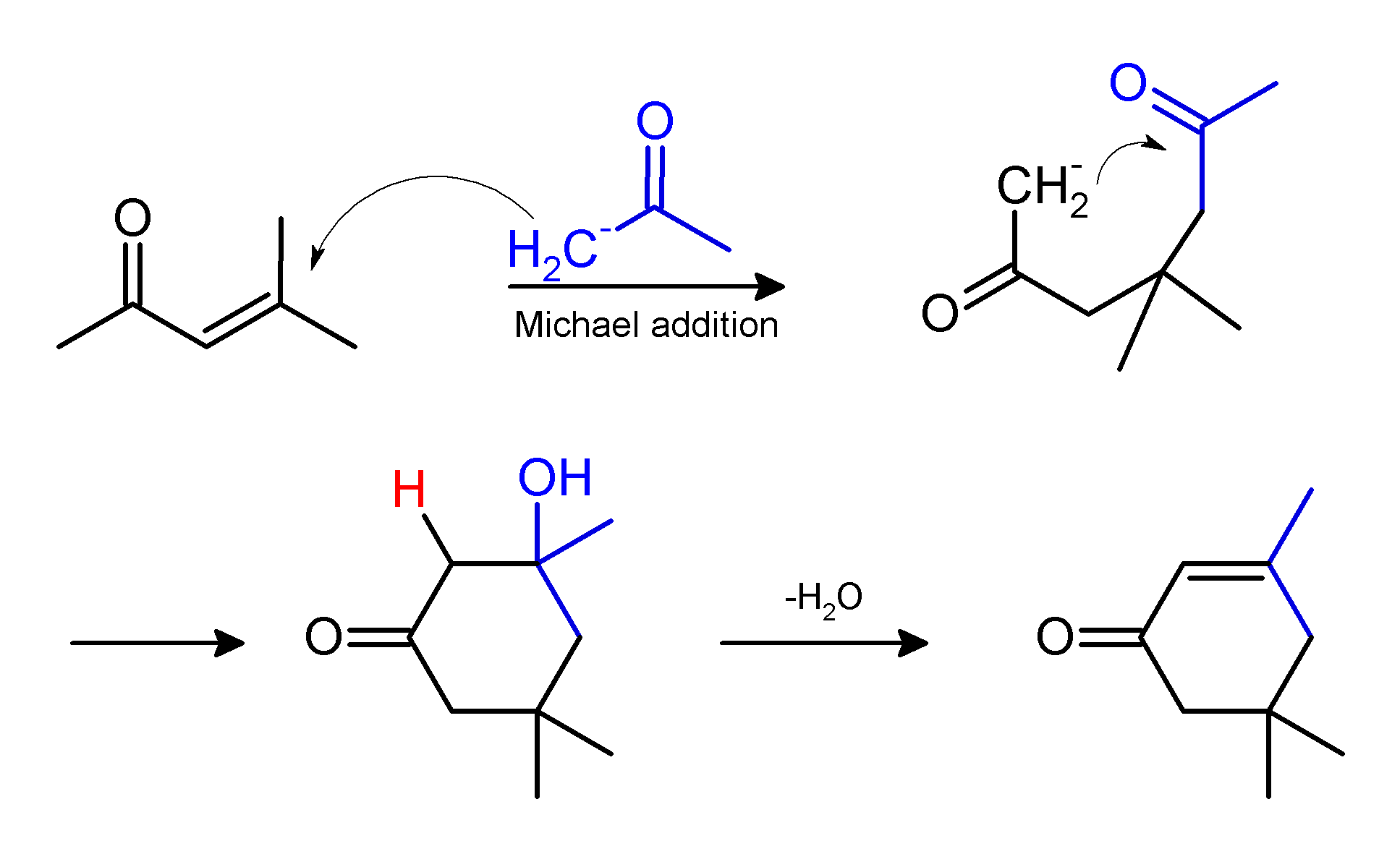

Phorone is formed by continued aldol condensation:

== Uses ==
Mesityl oxide can be converted into methyl isobutyl ketone by palladium-catalyzed hydrogenation:

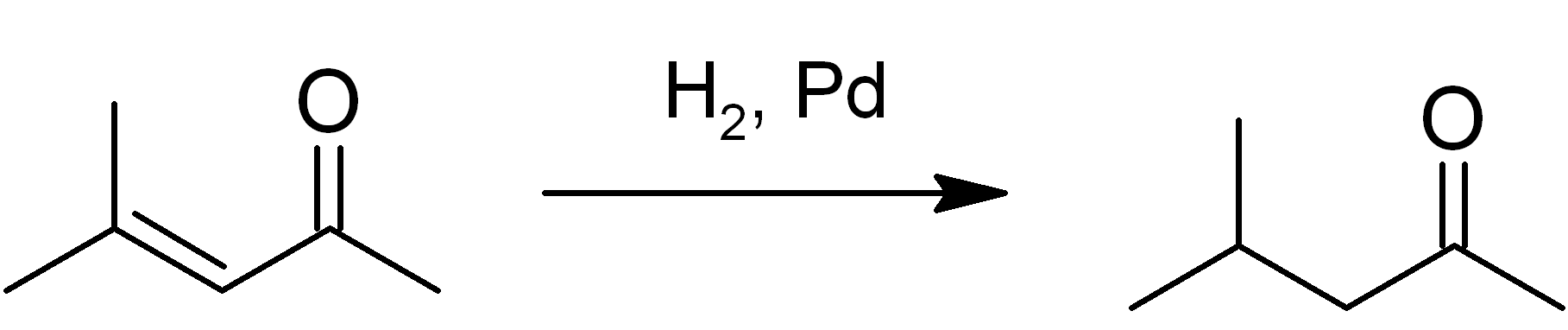

Further hydrogenation gives 4-methyl-2-pentanol (methyl isobutyl carbinol).

Dimedone is another established use of mesityl oxide.

Mesityl oxide also finds use in the synthesis of Diacetonamine [625-04-7], which itself finds application in synthesis of Eucaine & α-Eucaine.
