= Α-Eucaine =

Chemical compound

alpha-Eucaine

Clinical data
- Trade names: Alpha-Eucaine
- Other names: α-Eucaine; Eucaine A

Identifiers
- IUPAC name: Methyl 4-benzoyloxy-1,2,2,6,6-pentamethylpiperidine-4-carboxylate
- CAS Number: 470-68-8
- PubChem CID: 5282357
- ChemSpider: 4445520
- UNII: F4D4T58UFF
- KEGG: C14166
- ChEBI: CHEBI:35059
- CompTox Dashboard (EPA): DTXSID90415220

Chemical and physical data
- Formula: C_{19}H_{27}NO_{4}
- Molar mass: 333.428 g·mol^{−1}
- 3D model (JSmol): Interactive image
- SMILES: CC1(CC(CC(N1C)(C)C)(C(=O)OC)OC(=O)C2=CC=CC=C2)C
- InChI: InChI=1S/C19H27NO4/c1-17(2)12-19(16(22)23-6,13-18(3,4)20(17)5)24-15(21)14-10-8-7-9-11-14/h7-11H,12-13H2,1-6H3; Key:MJMZACWQGQGLBI-UHFFFAOYSA-N

α-Eucaine (alpha-eucaine) is a drug that was previously used as a local anesthetic. It was designed as an analog of cocaine and was one of the first synthetic chemical compounds to find general use as an anesthetic.

== Synthesis ==
Background:

The aldol condensation between two equivalents of acetone gives mesityl oxide (1), with isophorone as a side-product of this reaction. Ammonolysis of mesityl oxide formed diacetonamine (2). The reaction of this product with acetone then gives triacetonamine (3). N-Methylation of the secondary amine gives 1,2,2,6,6-pentamethylpiperidin-4-one (4). Cyanohydrin formation gives (5). Esterification of the tertiary alcohol with benzoyl chloride gives (6). Pinner reaction of the nitrile with acidified ethanol affords alpha-eucaine (7).

== See also ==
- Eucaine, or β-eucaine, a related local anesthetic
