= Ethylene diurea =

Names
- Preferred IUPAC name N,N′′-(Ethane-1,2-diyl)diurea
- Other names Ethanediurea; 1,1′-Ethylenebisurea

Identifiers
CAS Number	1852-14-8
3D model (JSmol)	Interactive image
ChemSpider	67189
ECHA InfoCard	100.015.856
PubChem CID	74614
UNII	SF5V93Q59N
CompTox Dashboard (EPA)	DTXSID0051819
- InChI: InChI=1S/C4H10N4O2/c5-3(9)7-1-2-8-4(6)10/h1-2H2,(H3,5,7,9)(H3,6,8,10) Key: ZUTJDJAXWKOOOI-UHFFFAOYSA-N; InChI=1/C4H10N4O2/c5-3(9)7-1-2-8-4(6)10/h1-2H2,(H3,5,7,9)(H3,6,8,10) Key: ZUTJDJAXWKOOOI-UHFFFAOYAH
- SMILES: O=C(NCCNC(=O)N)N

Properties
Chemical formula	C_{4}H_{10}N_{4}O_{2}
Molar mass	146.150 g·mol^{−1}
Melting point	192 °C (378 °F; 465 K)
- Except where otherwise noted, data are given for materials in their standard state (at 25 °C [77 °F], 100 kPa). Infobox references

Ethylene diurea (EDU) is an organic compound with the formula (CH_{2}NHCONH_{2})_{2}. It is a white solid.

The compound has attracted interest as a potential antiozonant for crop protection. With respect to preventing the harmful effects on crops by ozone, EDU appears to either prevent the harmful effects of ozone or it stimulated plant growth. Trees treated with EDU were significantly healthier in both leaf longevity and water use efficiency.

The effectiveness of EDU depends upon several environmental factors.
