= Structural analog =

Compound with a similar structure to another

A structural analog, also known as a chemical analog or simply an analog, is a compound having a structure similar to that of another compound, but differing from it in respect to a certain component.

It can differ in one or more atoms, functional groups, or substructures, which are replaced with other atoms, groups, or substructures. A structural analog can be imagined to be formed, at least theoretically, from the other compound. Structural analogs are often isoelectronic.

Despite a high chemical similarity, structural analogs are not necessarily functional analogs and can have very different physical, chemical, biochemical, or pharmacological properties.

In drug discovery, either a large series of structural analogs of an initial lead compound are created and tested as part of a structure–activity relationship study or a database is screened for structural analogs of a lead compound.

Chemical analogues of illegal drugs are developed and sold in order to circumvent laws. Such substances are often called designer drugs. Because of this, the United States passed the Federal Analogue Act in 1986. This bill banned the production of any chemical analogue of a Schedule I or Schedule II substance that has substantially similar pharmacological effects, with the intent of human consumption.

== Examples ==
Alcohols
Methanol

Silanol, a structural analog of methanol

Methanethiol, a structural analog of methanol
Phenethylamines
Phenethylamine

Amphetamine

Methamphetamine

== Neurotransmitter analog ==
A neurotransmitter analog is a structural analogue of a neurotransmitter, typically a drug. Some examples include:

- Catecholamine analogue
- GABA analogue
- Serotonin analogue

== See also ==
- Derivative (chemistry)
- Functional analog, compounds with similar physical, chemical, biochemical, or pharmacological properties
- Homolog, a compound of a series differing only by repeated units
- Transition state analog
