= 2-Methyl-2,4-pentanediol =

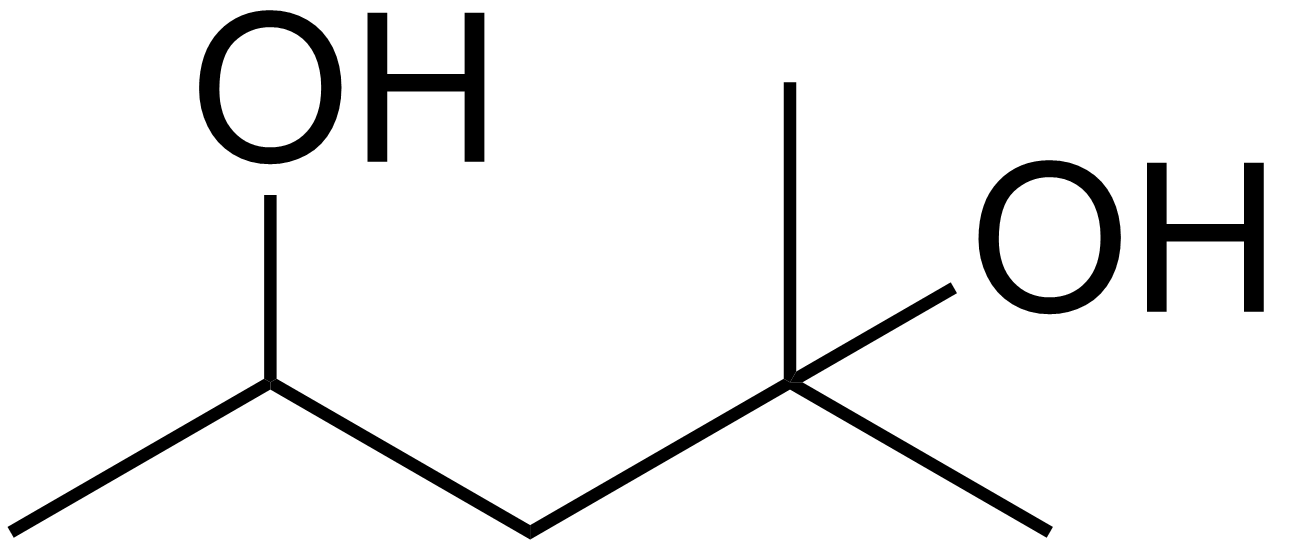

Names
- Preferred IUPAC name 2-Methylpentane-2,4-diol
- Other names 2-Methyl-2,4-pentanediol; Hexylene glycol Diolane; 1,1,3-Trimethyltrimethylenediol; 2,4-Dihydroxy-2-methylpentane; Isol

Identifiers
CAS Number	107-41-5; 99210-90-9 (R); 99210-91-0 (S)
3D model (JSmol)	Interactive image
Abbreviations	MPD
Beilstein Reference	1098298
ChEBI	CHEBI:62995
ChEMBL	ChEMBL2104293
ChemSpider	7582
ECHA InfoCard	100.003.173
EC Number	203-489-0
PubChem CID	7870
RTECS number	SA0810000
UNII	KEH0A3F75J
UN number	1993
CompTox Dashboard (EPA)	DTXSID5021885
- InChI: InChI=1S/C6H14O2/c1-5(7)4-6(2,3)8/h5,7-8H,4H2,1-3H3 Key: SVTBMSDMJJWYQN-UHFFFAOYSA-N
- SMILES: CC(CC(C)(C)O)O

Properties
Chemical formula	C_{6}H_{14}O_{2}
Molar mass	118.176 g·mol^{−1}
Appearance	colourless liquid
Odor	mild, sweetish
Density	0.92 g/mL
Melting point	−40 °C (−40 °F; 233 K)
Boiling point	197 °C (387 °F; 470 K)
Solubility in water	miscible
Vapor pressure	0.05 mmHg (20°C)

Hazards
- GHS labelling
Pictograms	(GHS07: Exclamation mark)
Signal word	Warning
Hazard statements	H315, H319
Precautionary statements	P264, P264+P265, P280, P302+P352, P305+P351+P338, P321, P332+P317, P337+P317, P362+P364
Flash point	98.3 °C (208.9 °F; 371.4 K)
Explosive limits	1.3%-7.4%
- NIOSH (US health exposure limits)
PEL (Permissible)	none
REL (Recommended)	C 25 ppm (125 mg/m^{3})
IDLH (Immediate danger)	N.D.
- Except where otherwise noted, data are given for materials in their standard state (at 25 °C [77 °F], 100 kPa). verify (what is ?) Infobox references

2-Methyl-2,4-pentanediol (MPD) is an organic compound with the formula (CH_{3})_{2}C(OH)CH_{2}CH(OH)CH_{3}. This colourless liquid is a chiral diol. It is produced industrially from diacetone alcohol by hydrogenation. Total European and USA production was 15000 tonnes in 2000.

2-Methyl-2,4-pentanediol exists as two enantiomers, (4R)-(−) and (4S)-(+). In the Protein Data Bank, the 3-letter code "MPD" refers to the (S)-(−) enantiomer, while "MRD" is used to refer to the (R)-(+) version. Commercial products labeled "MPD" are usually the racemate, also sold as and referred to as "hexylene glycol".

== Uses ==
2-Methyl-2,4-pentanediol exhibits both surfactant and emulsion-stabilizing properties. Its relatively high viscosity and low volatility are advantageous in coatings, cleansers, cosmetics, solvents, lubricants, and hydraulic fluids. Although it is an irritant at higher concentrations, it is sometimes used in skin care, hair care, soap, and eye cosmetic products at concentrations ranging from 0.1% - 25%.

It is biodegradable and unlikely to accumulate in the environment.

== Laboratory uses ==
In the laboratory it is a common precipitant and cryoprotectant in protein crystallography. Since hexylene glycol is compatible with polar and nonpolar molecules, it competes with the solvent in a crystallography experiment causing the protein to precipitate. Hexylene glycol is so effective in protein crystallography because its amphiphilic nature and small, flexible structure allows it to bind to many different locations on a protein secondary structure including alpha helices and beta sheets. When hexylene glycol binds to these different locations, water is removed and the protein crystals anneal, which prevents ice formation during cryocrystallography techniques. Incorporation of hexylene glycol into solution has been known to improve the resolution of X-ray diffraction making protein structures easily identifiable. Additionally hexylene glycol is not a strong denaturing agent and thus does not significantly alter the structure of a protein during the crystallography procedure.

Hexylene glycol is also used as a lubricant for polishing specimens in metallography.

Like related diols, it forms borate esters.
