= Eucaine =

Medication

Clinical data
- Trade names: Beta-Eucaine
- Other names: Betacaine; Betacain; Beta-eucaine; Eucaine B; Eucain B; β-Eucaine; Benzoylvinyldiacetonealkamine

Identifiers
- IUPAC name: [(4R,6S)-2,2,6-Trimethylpiperidin-4-yl] benzoate
- CAS Number: 500-34-5 (unspecified isomer)
- PubChem CID: 808817
- ChemSpider: 9945
- UNII: 7X49L994AY
- CompTox Dashboard (EPA): DTXSID80877873

Chemical and physical data
- Formula: C_{15}H_{21}NO_{2}
- Molar mass: 247.338 g·mol^{−1}
- 3D model (JSmol): Interactive image
- SMILES: C[C@H]1C[C@H](CC(N1)(C)C)OC(=O)C2=CC=CC=C2

Eucaine, also known as β-eucaine or Betacaine, is a drug that was previously used as a local anesthetic. It was designed as an analog of cocaine and was one of the first synthetic chemical compounds to find general use as an anesthetic. It is a white, crystalline solid. Prior to World War I, Britain imported eucaine from Germany. During the war, a team including Jocelyn Field Thorpe and Martha Annie Whiteley developed a synthesis in Britain.

The brand name Betacaine can sometimes refer to a preparation containing lidocaine, not eucaine.

== Synthesis ==
Synthesis:

Condensation of diacetonamine (1) with acetaldehyde gives the piperidone 2,2,6-trimethylpiperidin-4-one (2). Reduction of the ketone with sodium amalgam gives the alcohol as a mixture of isomers, 2,2,6-trimethylpiperidin-4-ol (3). Benzoylation then affords beta-eucaine (4).

== See also ==
- α-Eucaine, a related local anesthetic
