= 4-Aminodiphenylamine =

Chemical compound

Names
- Preferred IUPAC name N^{1}-Phenylbenzene-1,4-diamine
- Other names: 4-Aminodiphenylamine; p-Aminodiphenylamine; N-Phenyl-p-phenylenediamine; N-Phenyl-1,4-phenylenediamine; PPD

Identifiers
CAS Number	101-54-2
3D model (JSmol)	Interactive image
Beilstein Reference	908935
ChEBI	CHEBI:59038
ChEMBL	ChEMBL572203
ChemSpider	7283
ECHA InfoCard	100.002.684
EC Number	202-951-9
Gmelin Reference	241334
PubChem CID	7564
RTECS number	ST3150000
UNII	007X4XXS71
UN number	1673
CompTox Dashboard (EPA)	DTXSID7025895
- InChI: InChI=1S/C12H12N2/c13-10-6-8-12(9-7-10)14-11-4-2-1-3-5-11/h1-9,14H,13H2 Key: ATGUVEKSASEFFO-UHFFFAOYSA-N
- SMILES: C1=CC=C(C=C1)NC2=CC=C(C=C2)N

Properties
Chemical formula	C_{12}H_{12}N_{2}
Molar mass	184.242 g·mol^{−1}
Appearance	purple–black or dark purple
Density	1.09 g/mL
Melting point	75 °C (167 °F; 348 K)
Boiling point	354 °C (669 °F; 627 K)

Hazards
- GHS labelling
Pictograms	(GHS07: Exclamation mark) (GHS09: Environmental hazard)
Signal word	Warning
Hazard statements	H302, H317, H319, H410
Precautionary statements	P261, P264, P270, P272, P273, P280, P301+P312, P302+P352, P305+P351+P338, P321, P330, P333+P313, P337+P313, P363, P391, P501
- Except where otherwise noted, data are given for materials in their standard state (at 25 °C [77 °F], 100 kPa). Infobox references

4-Aminodiphenylamine is a diphenylamine with an additional amine substituent. This dimer of aniline has various industrial uses, including as a hair dye ingredient, but also has raised concerns about toxicity by skin contact. It is also a starting material for the synthesis of 6PPD, an antiozonant for various rubber products. A colorimetric test for the quantitative analysis of nitrite, at levels below 100 nanograms per milliliter, is based on nitrite-catalyzed coupling of 4-aminodiphenylamine with N,N-dimethylaniline.

== Synthesis ==
The most common route of industrial production is by the metal catalysed reaction of aniline with 4‑nitrochlorobenzene to give 4‑nitrodiphenylamine (Buchwald–Hartwig amination):

Subsequent hydrogenation gives 4-aminodiphenylamine. An alternative is the direct reaction of nitrobenzene with aniline via a nucleophilic aromatic substitution of hydrogen (vicarious nucleophilic substitution). This again requires a reduction step but is a good example of industrial green chemistry as it eliminates the need for organochlorine starting materials and metal catalysts.
