= Acetone =

Organic compound ((CH3)2CO); simplest ketone

Full structural formula of acetone with dimensions
Skeletal formula of acetone
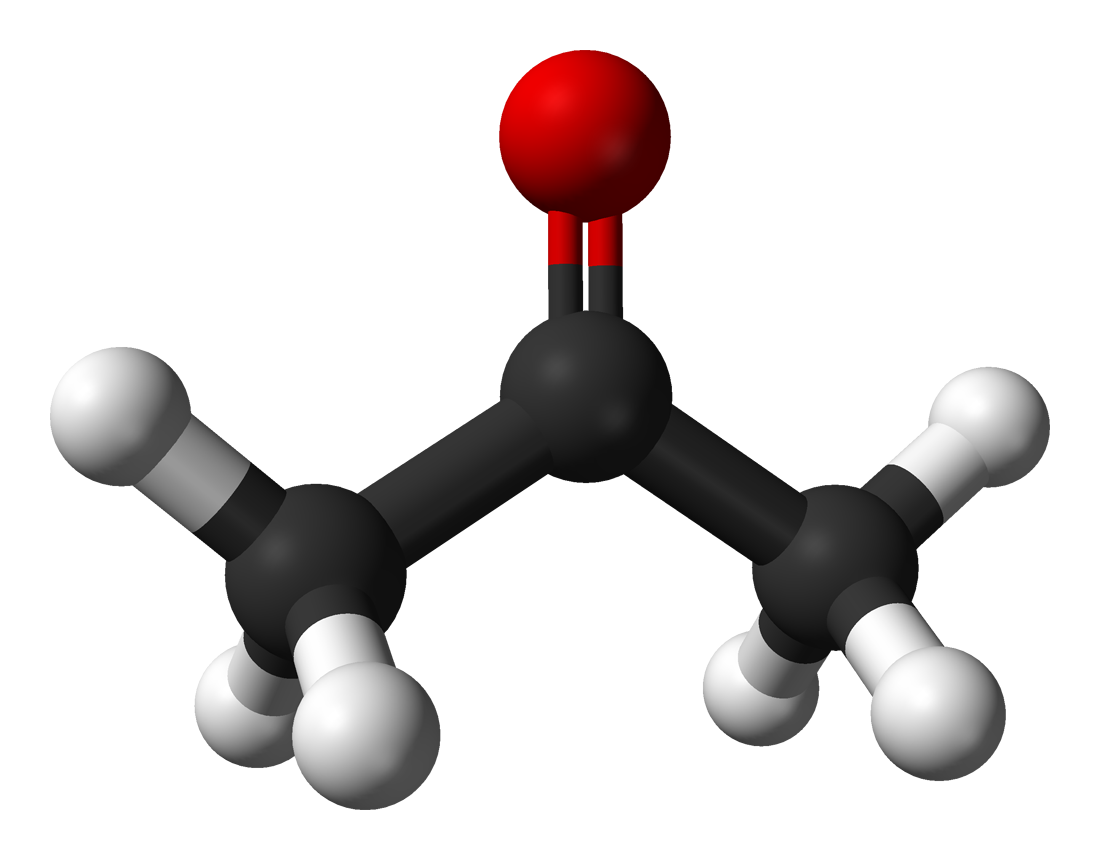
Ball-and-stick model of acetone
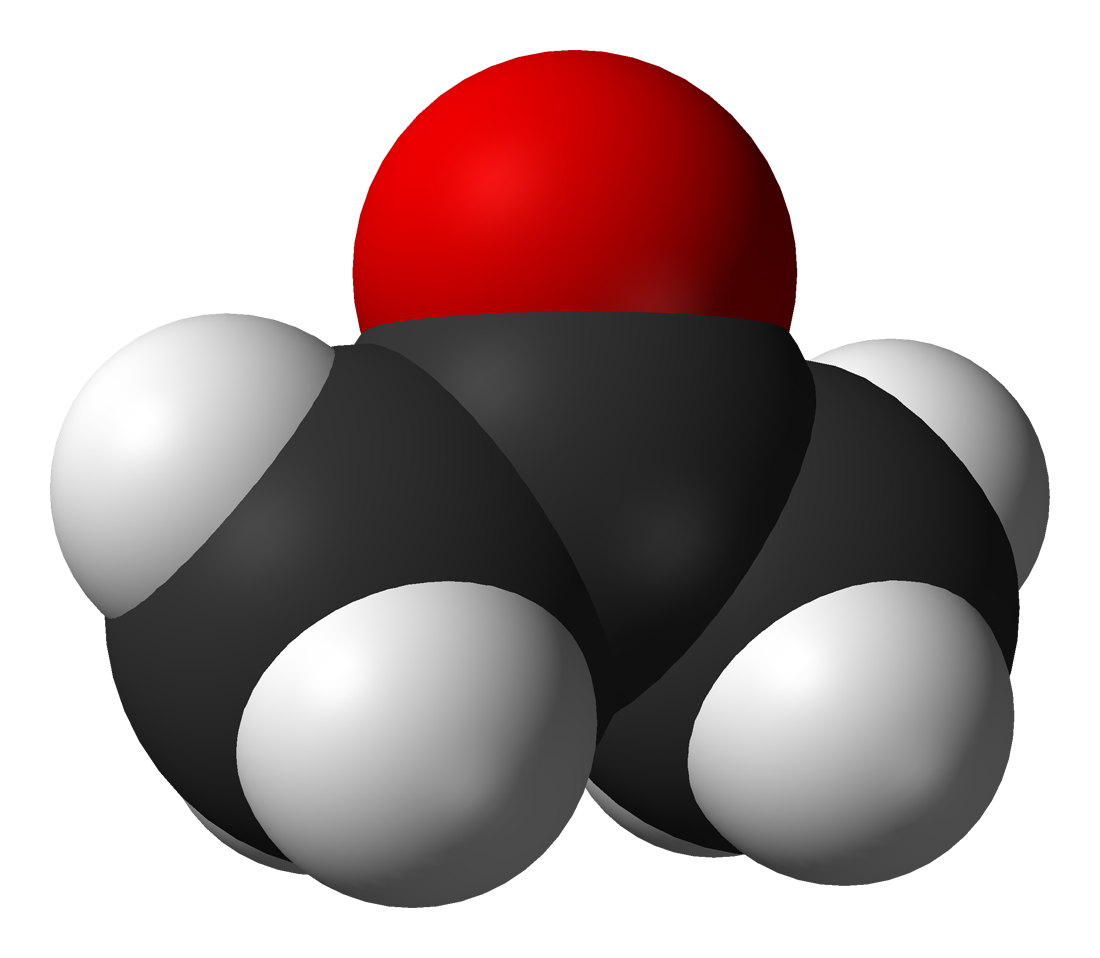
Space-filling model of acetone
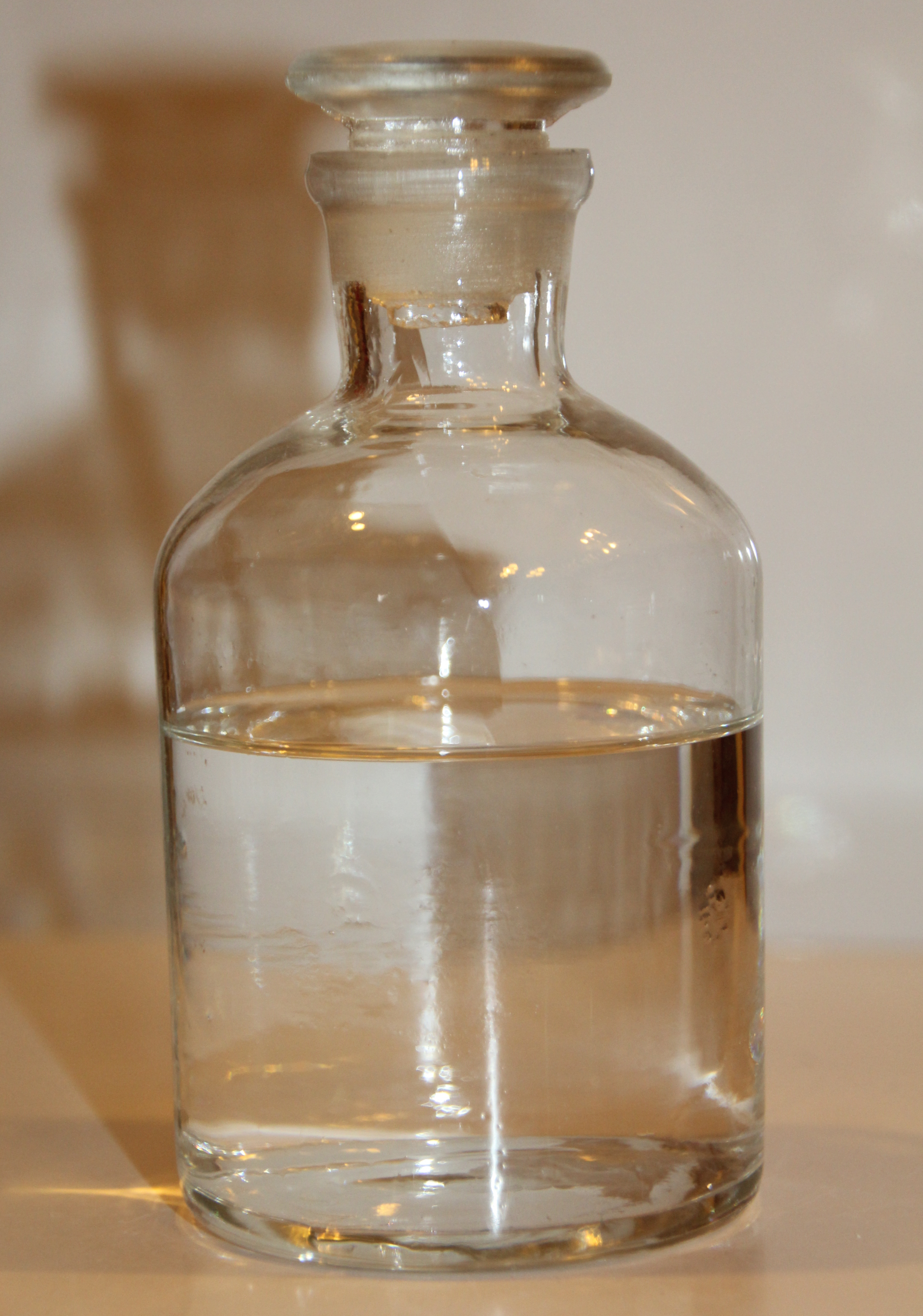
- Sample of acetone

Names
- IUPAC name Acetone
- Preferred IUPAC name Propan-2-one
- Systematic IUPAC name Propan-2-one
- Other names: Acetonum (Latin pronunciation: [aˈkeːtonum]); Dimethyl ketone; Dimethyl carbonyl; Ketone propane; β-Ketopropane; Propanone; Pyroacetic spirit (archaic); Spirit of Saturn (archaic)

Identifiers
CAS Number	67-64-1
3D model (JSmol)	Interactive image
Abbreviations	Me_{2}CO
Beilstein Reference	635680
ChEBI	CHEBI:15347
ChEMBL	ChEMBL14253
ChemSpider	175
ECHA InfoCard	100.000.602
EC Number	200-662-2
Gmelin Reference	1466
KEGG	D02311
MeSH	Acetone
PubChem CID	180
RTECS number	AL3150000
UNII	1364PS73AF
UN number	1090
CompTox Dashboard (EPA)	DTXSID8021482
- InChI: InChI=1S/C3H6O/c1-3(2)4/h1-2H3 Key: CSCPPACGZOOCGX-UHFFFAOYSA-N; InChI=1/C3H6O/c1-3(2)4/h1-2H3 Key: CSCPPACGZOOCGX-UHFFFAOYAF
- SMILES: CC(=O)C

Properties
Chemical formula	C_{3}H_{6}O
Molar mass	58.080 g·mol^{−1}
Appearance	Colourless liquid
Odor	Pungent, fruity, dry
Density	0.7845 g/cm^{3} (25 °C)
Melting point	−94.9 °C (−138.8 °F; 178.2 K)
Boiling point	56.08 °C (132.94 °F; 329.23 K)
Critical point (T, P)	508 K (235 °C), 48 bar
Solubility in water	Miscible
Solubility	Miscible in benzene, diethyl ether, methanol, chloroform, ethanol
log P	−0.24
Vapor pressure	9.39 kPa (0 °C); 30.6 kPa (25 °C); 374 kPa (100 °C); 2.8 MPa (200 °C)
Acidity (pK_{a})	19.16 (H_{2}O); 26.5 (DMSO)
Magnetic susceptibility (χ)	−33.8·10^{−6} cm^{3}/mol
Thermal conductivity	0.161 W/(m·K) (25 °C)
Refractive index (n_{D})	1.3588 (20 °C)
Viscosity	0.4013 mPa·s (0 °C); 0.3311 mPa·s at 20 °C; 0.306 mPa·s (25 °C); 0.2562 mPa·s at 50 °C

Structure
Coordination geometry	Trigonal planar at C2
Molecular shape	Dihedral at C2
Dipole moment	2.88 D

Thermochemistry
Heat capacity (C)	126.3 J/(mol·K) (liquid); 75 J/(mol·K) (gas); 96 J/(mol·K) (solid)
Std molar entropy (S^{⦵}_{298})	199.8 J/(mol·K) (liquid); 295.35 J/(mol·K) (gas)
Std enthalpy of formation (Δ_{f}H^{⦵}_{298})	−248.4 kJ/mol (liquid) −218.5 kJ/mol (gas)
Std enthalpy of combustion (Δ_{c}H^{⦵}_{298})	−1.79 MJ/mol
Enthalpy of fusion (Δ_{f}H^{⦵}_{fus})	+5.7 kJ/mol
Enthalpy of vaporization (Δ_{f}H_{vap})	+30.3 kJ/mol

Hazards
- Occupational safety and health (OHS/OSH)
Main hazards	Highly flammable
- GHS labelling
Pictograms	(GHS02: Flammable) (GHS07: Exclamation mark)
Signal word	Danger
Hazard statements	H225, H302, H319, H336, H373
Precautionary statements	P210, P235, P260, P305+P351+P338
NFPA 704 (fire diamond)	1 3 0
Flash point	−20 °C (−4 °F; 253 K)
Autoignition temperature	465 °C (869 °F; 738 K)
Explosive limits	2.5–12.8%
Threshold limit value (TLV)	250 ppm (STEL), 500 ppm (C)
- Lethal dose or concentration (LD, LC)
LD_{50} (median dose)	5800 mg/kg (rat, oral); 3000 mg/kg (mouse, oral); 5340 mg/kg (rabbit, oral)
LC_{50} (median concentration)	20,702 ppm (rat, 8 h)
LC_{Lo} (lowest published)	45,455 ppm (mouse, 1 h)
- NIOSH (US health exposure limits)
PEL (Permissible)	1000 ppm (2400 mg/m^{3})
REL (Recommended)	TWA 250 ppm (590 mg/m^{3})
IDLH (Immediate danger)	2500 ppm

Related compounds
Related compounds	Butanone; Isopropyl alcohol; Formaldehyde; Urea; Carbonic acid

Supplementary data page
- Acetone (data page)
- Except where otherwise noted, data are given for materials in their standard state (at 25 °C [77 °F], 100 kPa). verify (what is ?) Infobox references

Acetone (2-propanone or dimethyl ketone) is an organic compound with the formula (CH_{3})_{2}CO. It is the simplest and smallest ketone (R−C(=O)−R'). It is a colorless, highly volatile, and flammable liquid with a characteristic pungent odor.

Acetone is miscible with water and serves as an important organic solvent in industry, home, and laboratory settings. About 6.7 million tonnes were produced worldwide in 2010, mainly for use as a solvent and for production of methyl methacrylate and bisphenol A, which are precursors to widely used plastics. It is a common building block in organic chemistry. It serves as a solvent in household products such as nail polish remover and paint thinner. It has volatile organic compound (VOC)-exempt status in the United States.

Acetone is produced and disposed of in the human body through normal metabolic processes. Small quantities of it are present naturally in blood and urine. People with diabetic ketoacidosis produce it in larger amounts. Medical ketogenic diets that increase ketone bodies (acetone, β-hydroxybutyric acid and acetoacetic acid) in the blood are used to suppress epileptic attacks in children with treatment-resistant epilepsy.

== Name ==
From the 17th century, and before modern developments in organic chemistry nomenclature, acetone was given many different names. They included "spirit of Saturn", which was given when it was thought to be a compound of lead and, later, "pyro-acetic spirit" and "pyro-acetic ester".

Prior to the name "acetone" being coined by French chemists, it was named "mesit" (from the Greek μεσίτης, meaning mediator) by Carl Reichenbach, who also said that methyl alcohol consisted of mesit and ethyl alcohol. Names derived from mesit include mesitylene and mesityl oxide which were first synthesised from acetone.

In 1839, the name "acetone" began to be used, because it was obtained from acetic acid. Unlike many compounds with the acet- prefix which have a 2-carbon chain, acetone has a 3-carbon chain. That has caused confusion because there cannot be a ketone with 2 carbons. The prefix refers to acetone's relation to vinegar (acetum in Latin, also the source of the words "acid" and "acetic"), rather than its chemical structure.

== History ==
Acetone was first produced by Andreas Libavius in 1606 by distillation of lead(II) acetate. In 1832, French chemist Jean-Baptiste Dumas and German chemist Justus von Liebig determined the empirical formula for acetone. In 1833, French chemists Antoine Bussy and Michel Chevreul decided to name acetone by adding the suffix -one to the stem of the corresponding acid (viz, acetic acid) just as a similarly prepared product of what was then confused with margaric acid was named margarone. By 1852, Alexander William Williamson, an English chemist, realized that acetone was methyl acetyl; the following year, the French chemist Charles Frédéric Gerhardt concurred. In 1865, a German chemist, August Kekulé published the modern structural formula for acetone. Johann Josef Loschmidt had presented the structure of acetone in 1861, but his privately published booklet received little attention. During World War I, Chaim Weizmann developed the biochemical process for industrial production of acetone (Weizmann Process).

== Production ==
Acetone is produced directly or indirectly from propene. Approximately 83% of acetone is produced via the cumene process; as a result, acetone production is tied to phenol production. In the cumene process, benzene is alkylated with propylene to produce cumene, which is oxidized by air to produce acetone and phenol:

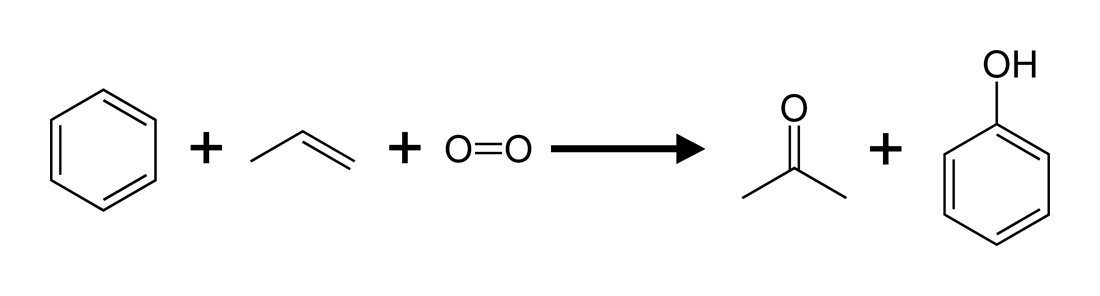

Other processes involve the direct oxidation of propylene (Wacker-Hoechst process), or the hydration of propylene to give 2-propanol, which is oxidized (dehydrogenated) to acetone. Previously, acetone was produced by the dry distillation of acetates, for example calcium acetate in ketonic decarboxylation.

Ca(CH_{3}COO)_{2} → CaO(s) + CO_{2}(g) + (CH_{3})_{2}CO

After that time during World War I, acetone was produced using acetone-butanol-ethanol fermentation with Clostridium acetobutylicum bacteria, which was developed by Chaim Weizmann in order to help the British war effort, in the preparation of Cordite. This acetone-butanol-ethanol fermentation was eventually abandoned when newer methods with better yields were found.

In 2010, the worldwide production capacity for acetone was estimated at 6.7 million tonnes per year. With 1.56 million tonnes per year, the United States had the highest production capacity, followed by Taiwan and China. The largest producer of acetone is Ineos Phenol, owning 17% of the world's capacity, with also significant capacity (7–8%) by Mitsui, Sunoco and Shell in 2010. Ineos Phenol also owns the world's largest production site (420,000 tonnes/annum) in Beveren, Belgium. The spot price of acetone in summer 2011 was 1100–1250 USD/tonne in the United States.

== Occurrence ==
Humans exhale 1.2 to 2.5 mg of acetone per day and it arises from the decarboxylation of acetoacetate. Small amounts of acetone are produced in the body by the decarboxylation of ketone bodies. Certain dietary patterns including prolonged fasting and high-fat low-carbohydrate dieting, can produce ketosis, in which acetone is formed in body tissue. Certain health conditions, such as alcoholism and diabetes, can produce ketoacidosis, uncontrollable ketosis that leads to a sharp, and potentially fatal, increase in the acidity of the blood. Since it is a byproduct of fermentation, acetone is a byproduct of the distillery industry.

Acetone is naturally occurring. It is produced by terrestrial vegetation, undefined ocean processes, incomplete combustion of biomass, or oxidation of hydrocarbons in the atmosphere.

== Chemical properties ==
Acetone is reluctant to form a hydrate:

(CH_{3})_{2}C=O + H_{2}O ⇌ (CH_{3})_{2}C(OH)_{2} K = 10^{−3} M^{−1}

Like most ketones, acetone exhibits the keto–enol tautomerism in which the nominal keto structure (CH_{3})_{2}C=O of acetone itself is in equilibrium with the enol isomer (CH_{3})C(OH)=(CH_{2}) (prop-1-en-2-ol). In acetone vapor at ambient temperature, only 2.4×10^{−7}% of the molecules are in the enol form.

In the presence of suitable catalysts, two acetone molecules also combine to form the compound diacetone alcohol (CH_{3})C=O(CH_{2})C(OH)(CH_{3})_{2}, which on dehydration gives mesityl oxide (CH_{3})C=O(CH)=C(CH_{3})_{2}. This product can further combine with another acetone molecule, with loss of another molecule of water, yielding phorone and other compounds.

Acetone is a weak Lewis base that forms adducts with soft acids like I_{2} and hard acids like phenol. Acetone also forms complexes with divalent metals.

Under ultraviolet light, acetone fluoresces. The flame temperature of pure acetone is 1980 °C. At its melting point (−96 °C) it is claimed to polymerize to give a white elastic solid, soluble in acetone, stable for several hours at room temperature. To do so, a vapor of acetone is co-condensed with magnesium as a catalyst onto a very cold surface.

=== Photochemistry ===
The outcome of irradiation of acetone is wavelength dependent. At short wavelengths (<290 nm), carbon monoxide and methyl radicals are produced in high quantum yield:

(CH_{3})_{2}CO → 2 CH_{3} + CO

At wavelengths >290 nm, the acetyl radical is produced:

(CH_{3})_{2}CO → CH_{3} + CH_{3}CO

The latter process is relevant to the atmospheric chemistry of acetone.

=== Catabolism ===
Acetone can then be metabolized either by CYP2E1 via methylglyoxal to D-lactate and pyruvate, and ultimately glucose/energy, or by a different pathway via propylene glycol to pyruvate, lactate, acetate (usable for energy) and propionaldehyde.

== Uses ==
About a third of the world's acetone is used as a solvent, and a quarter is consumed as acetone cyanohydrin, a precursor to methyl methacrylate.

=== Chemical intermediate ===
Acetone is used to synthesize methyl methacrylate. It begins with the initial conversion of acetone to acetone cyanohydrin via reaction with hydrogen cyanide (HCN):

(CH_{3})_{2}CO + HCN → (CH_{3})_{2}C(OH)CN

In a subsequent step, the nitrile is hydrolyzed to the unsaturated amide, which is esterified:

(CH_{3})_{2}C(OH)CN + CH_{3}OH → CH_{2}C(CH_{3})CO_{2}CH_{3} + NH_{3}

The third major use of acetone (about 20%) is synthesizing bisphenol A. Bisphenol A is a component of many polymers such as polycarbonates, polyurethanes, and epoxy resins. The synthesis involves the condensation of acetone with phenol:

(CH_{3})_{2}CO + 2 C_{6}H_{5}OH → (CH_{3})_{2}C(C_{6}H_{4}OH)_{2} + H_{2}O

Many millions of kilograms of acetone are consumed in the production of the solvents methyl isobutyl alcohol and methyl isobutyl ketone. These products arise via an initial aldol condensation to give diacetone alcohol.

2 (CH_{3})_{2}CO → (CH_{3})_{2}C(OH)CH_{2}C(O)CH_{3}

Condensation with acetylene gives 2-methylbut-3-yn-2-ol, precursor to synthetic terpenes and terpenoids.

=== Solvent ===
Acetone is a good solvent for many plastics and some synthetic fibers. It is used for thinning polyester resin, cleaning tools used with it, and dissolving two-part epoxies and superglue before they harden. It is used as one of the volatile components of some paints and varnishes. As a heavy-duty degreaser, it is useful in the preparation of metal prior to painting or soldering, and to remove rosin flux after soldering (to prevent adhesion of dirt and electrical leakage and perhaps corrosion or for cosmetic reasons), although it may attack some electronic components, such as polystyrene capacitors.

Although itself flammable, acetone is used extensively as a solvent for the safe transportation and storage of acetylene, which cannot be safely pressurized as a pure compound. Vessels containing a porous material are first filled with acetone followed by acetylene, which dissolves into the acetone. One litre of acetone can dissolve around 250 litres of acetylene at a pressure of 10 bars (1.0 MPa). Acetone is used as a solvent by the pharmaceutical industry and as a denaturant in denatured alcohol. Acetone is also present as an excipient in some pharmaceutical drugs.

==== Lab and domestic solvent ====
A variety of organic reactions employ acetone as a polar, aprotic solvent, e.g. the Jones oxidation. Because acetone is cheap, volatile, and dissolves or decomposes with most laboratory chemicals, an acetone rinse is the standard technique to remove solid residues from laboratory glassware before a final wash. Despite common desiccatory use, acetone dries only via bulk displacement and dilution. It forms no azeotropes with water (see azeotrope tables). Acetone also removes certain stains from microscope slides.

Acetone freezes well below −78 °C. An acetone/dry ice mixture cools many low-temperature reactions. Make-up artists use acetone to remove skin adhesive from the netting of wigs and mustaches by immersing the item in an acetone bath, then removing the softened glue residue with a stiff brush. Acetone is a main ingredient in many nail polish removers because it breaks down nail polish. It is used for all types of nail polish removal, like gel nail polish, dip powder and acrylic nails.

==== Biology ====
Proteins precipitate in acetone. The chemical modifies peptides, both at α- or ε-amino groups, and in a poorly understood but rapid modification of certain glycine residues. In pathology, acetone helps find lymph nodes in fatty tissues (such as the mesentery) for tumor staging. The liquid dissolves the fat and hardens the nodes, making them easier to find.

=== Medical ===
Dermatologists use acetone with alcohol for acne treatments to chemically peel dry skin. Common agents used for chemical peeling are salicylic acid, glycolic acid, azelaic acid, 30% salicylic acid in ethanol, and trichloroacetic acid (TCA). Prior to chemexfoliation, the skin is cleaned and excess fat removed in a process called defatting, using acetone, hexachlorophene, or a combination of these agents.

Acetone has been shown to have anticonvulsant effects in animal models of epilepsy, in the absence of toxicity, when administered in millimolar concentrations. It has been hypothesized that the high-fat low-carbohydrate ketogenic diet used clinically to control drug-resistant epilepsy in children works by elevating acetone in the brain. Because of their higher energy requirements, children have higher acetone production than most adults – and the younger the child, the higher the expected production. This indicates that children are not uniquely susceptible to acetone exposure. External exposures are small compared to the exposures associated with the ketogenic diet.

== Atmospheric chemistry ==
Acetone has a relatively long lifetime in the atmosphere of about 2 weeks. Because of its long lifetime, it can be transported by atmospheric winds to the upper troposphere and lower stratosphere where it can influence hydrogen radical (HO_{x}) production and ozone (O_{3}) levels. These two peroxy radicals can then undergo a series of reactions to produce hydrogen oxide radicals (HO_{x}) and can therefore have a significant impact on atmospheric chemistry including concentration of ozone (O_{3}) in the upper troposphere. Photolysis is just one possible processes that removes acetone from the atmosphere. Acetone can also be removed by ocean processes and by deposition to dry land surfaces. The contributions of each sink to the removal of acetone from the atmosphere is still not fully understood.

== Safety ==
Acetone's most hazardous property is its extreme flammability. In small amounts, acetone burns with a dull blue flame; in larger amounts, fuel evaporation causes incomplete combustion and a bright yellow flame. When above acetone's flash point of −20 °C (−4 °F), air mixtures of 2.5‑12.8% acetone (by volume) may explode or cause a flash fire. Vapors can flow along surfaces to distant ignition sources and flash back. Static discharge may ignite acetone vapors, though acetone has a very high ignition initiation energy and accidental ignition is rare. Acetone's auto-ignition temperature is relatively high 465 °C (869 °F); moreover, auto-ignition temperature depends upon experimental conditions, such as exposure time, and has been quoted as high as 535 °C. Even pouring or spraying acetone over red-glowing coal will not ignite it, due to the high vapour concentration and the cooling effect of evaporation.

Acetone should be stored away from strong oxidizers, such as concentrated nitric and sulfuric acid mixtures. It may explode when stored with chloroform in the presence of a base. When oxidized without combustion, for example with hydrogen peroxide, acetone may form acetone peroxide, a highly unstable primary explosive. Acetone peroxide may be formed accidentally, e.g. when waste peroxide is poured into waste solvents.

=== Toxicity ===
Acetone occurs naturally as part of certain metabolic processes in the human body, and has been studied extensively and is believed to exhibit only slight toxicity in normal use. There is no strong evidence of chronic health effects if basic precautions are followed. It is generally recognized to have low acute and chronic toxicity if ingested and/or inhaled. Acetone is not regarded as a carcinogen, a mutagen, or a concern for chronic neurotoxicity effects. Acetone can be found as an ingredient in a variety of consumer products ranging from cosmetics to processed and unprocessed foods. The United States Food and Drug Administration rates acetone as a generally recognized as safe (GRAS) substance when present in food and drink at concentrations from 5 to 8 mg/L.

Acetone is an irritant, causing mild skin and moderate-to-severe eye irritation. Like many other solvents, acetone may depress the central nervous system at high vapor concentrations. Acute toxicity for mice by ingestion (LD_{50}) is 3 g/kg, and by inhalation (LC_{50}) is 44 g/m^{3} over 4 hours.

=== EPA classification ===
In 1995, the United States Environmental Protection Agency (EPA) removed acetone from the list of volatile organic compounds. The companies requesting the removal argued that it would "contribute to the achievement of several important environmental goals and would support EPA's pollution prevention efforts", and that acetone could be used as a substitute for several compounds that are listed as hazardous air pollutants (HAP) under section 112 of the Clean Air Act. In making its decision EPA conducted an extensive review of the available toxicity data on acetone, which was continued through the 2000s. It found that the evaluable "data are inadequate for an assessment of the human carcinogenic potential of acetone".

== Abiotic sources ==
On 30 July 2015, scientists reported that upon the first touchdown of the Philae lander on comet 67P's surface, measurements by the COSAC and Ptolemy instruments revealed sixteen organic compounds, four of which were seen for the first time on a comet, including acetamide, acetone, methyl isocyanate, and propionaldehyde.

== Notes ==
- Haynes, William M., ed. (2016). CRC Handbook of Chemistry and Physics (97th ed.). CRC Press. ISBN 978-1-4987-5429-3.
