= P-Phenylenediamine =

p-Phenylenediamine

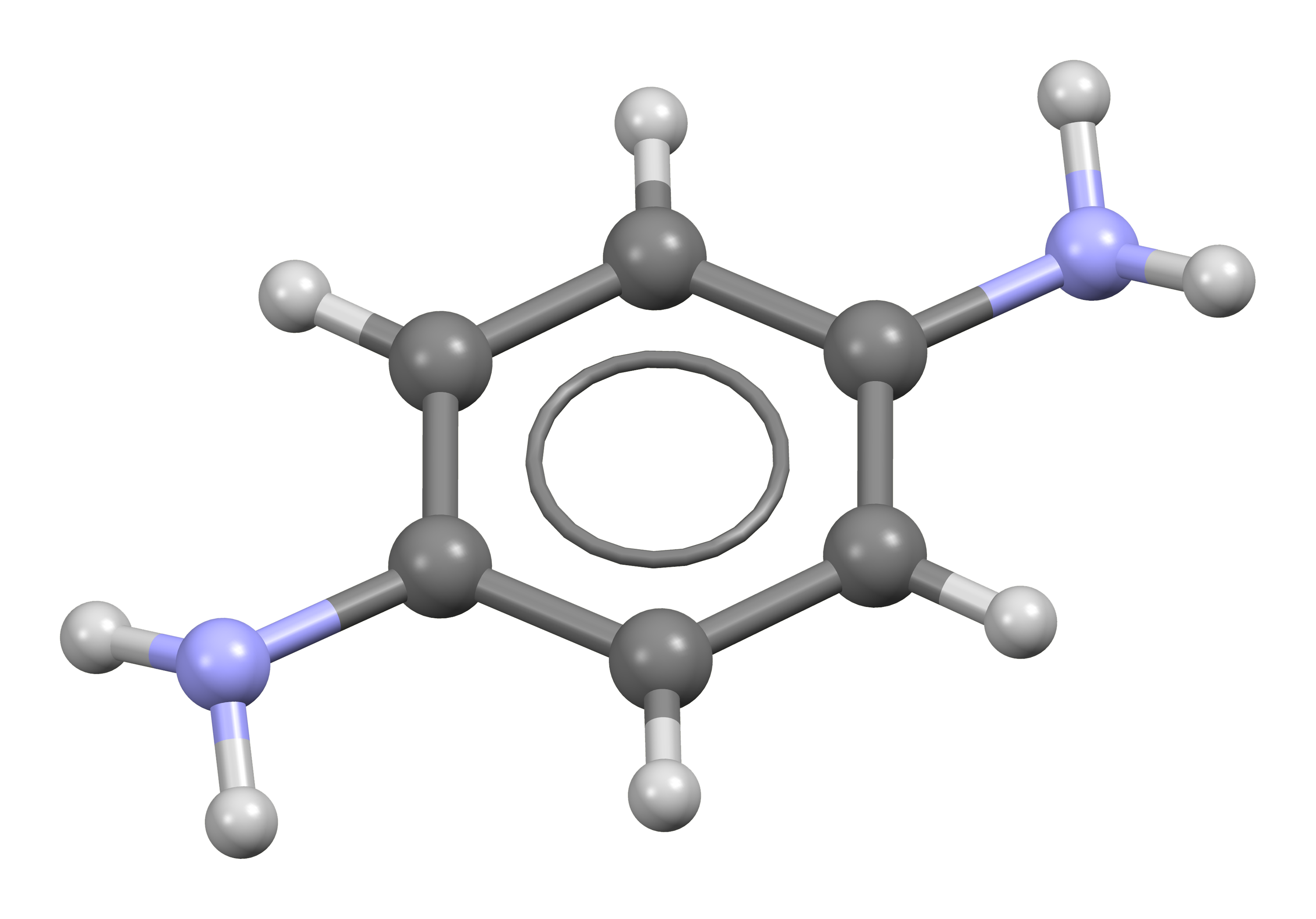

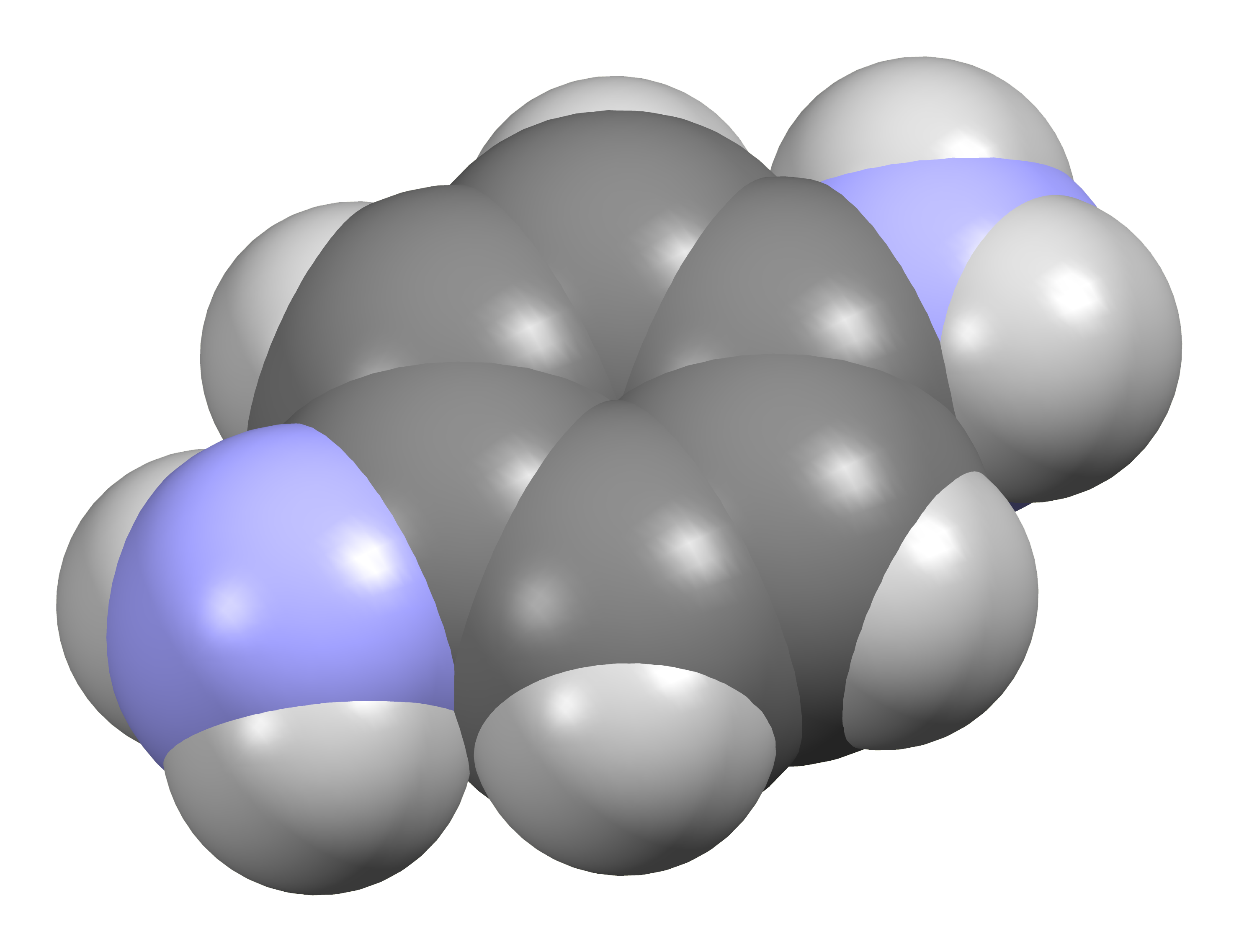

Names
- Preferred IUPAC name Benzene-1,4-diamine
- Other names Paraphenylenediamine; 1,4-Diaminobenzene; 1,4-Phenylenediamine

Identifiers
CAS Number	106-50-3
3D model (JSmol)	Interactive image
Beilstein Reference	749029
ChEBI	CHEBI:51403
ChEMBL	ChEMBL403741
ChemSpider	13835179
DrugBank	DB14141
ECHA InfoCard	100.003.096
EC Number	203-404-7
KEGG	C19499
PubChem CID	7814
RTECS number	SS8050000
UNII	U770QIT64J
UN number	1673
CompTox Dashboard (EPA)	DTXSID9021138
- InChI: InChI=1S/C6H8N2/c7-5-1-2-6(8)4-3-5/h1-4H,7-8H2 Key: CBCKQZAAMUWICA-UHFFFAOYSA-N; InChI=1/C6H8N2/c7-5-1-2-6(8)4-3-5/h1-4H,7-8H2 Key: CBCKQZAAMUWICA-UHFFFAOYAD
- SMILES: Nc1ccc(N)cc1

Properties
Chemical formula	C_{6}H_{8}N_{2}
Molar mass	108.144 g·mol^{−1}
Appearance	White crystalline solid, darkens upon exposure to air
Melting point	145 to 147 °C (293 to 297 °F; 418 to 420 K)
Boiling point	267 °C (513 °F; 540 K)
Solubility in water	10% at 40°C, 87% at 107 C, 100% at 140 C
Vapor pressure	<1 mmHg (20°C)
Acidity (pK_{a})	2.97 (doubly protonated form; 20 °C, H_{2}O); 6.31 (conjugate acid; 20 °C, H_{2}O)
Magnetic susceptibility (χ)	−70.28·10^{−6} cm^{3}/mol

Hazards
- GHS labelling
Pictograms	(GHS06: Toxic) (GHS07: Exclamation mark) (GHS09: Environmental hazard)
Signal word	Danger
Hazard statements	H301, H311, H317, H319, H331, H410
Precautionary statements	P261, P264, P270, P271, P272, P273, P280, P301+P310, P302+P352, P304+P340, P305+P351+P338, P311, P312, P321, P322, P330, P333+P313, P337+P313, P361, P363, P391, P403+P233, P405, P501
NFPA 704 (fire diamond)	3 0 0
Flash point	156 °C; 312 °F; 429 K
Autoignition temperature	400 °C (752 °F; 673 K)
- Lethal dose or concentration (LD, LC)
LD_{50} (median dose)	80 mg/kg (rat, oral); 98 mg/kg (rat, oral); 145 mg/kg (guinea pig, oral)
LD_{Lo} (lowest published)	250 mg/kg (rabbit, oral); 100 mg/kg (cat, oral)
- NIOSH (US health exposure limits)
PEL (Permissible)	TWA 0.1 mg/m^{3} [skin]
REL (Recommended)	TWA 0.1 mg/m^{3} [skin]
IDLH (Immediate danger)	25 mg/m^{3}
- Except where otherwise noted, data are given for materials in their standard state (at 25 °C [77 °F], 100 kPa). verify (what is ?) Infobox references

p-Phenylenediamine (PPD) is an organic compound with the formula C_{6}H_{4}(NH_{2})_{2}. This derivative of aniline is a white solid, but samples can darken due to air oxidation. It is mainly used as a component of engineering polymers and synthetic fibers like Twaron and Kevlar. It is also an ingredient in hair dyes and is occasionally used as a substitute for Henna.

== Production ==
PPD is produced via three routes. Most commonly, 4-nitrochlorobenzene is treated with ammonia and the resulting 4-nitroaniline is then hydrogenated:

In the DuPont route, aniline is converted to diphenyltriazine, which is then converted by acid-catalysis to 4-aminoazobenzene. Hydrogenation of the latter affords PPD.

== Uses ==
=== Precursor to polymers ===
PPD is a precursor to aramid plastics and fibers such as kevlar and twaron. These applications exploit PPD's difunctionality, i.e. the presence of two amines which allow the molecules to be strung together. This polymer arises from the reaction of PPD and terephthaloyl chloride. The reaction of PPD with phosgene gives the diisocyanate, a precursor to urethane polymers.

Molecular structure of Kevlar: the monomer subunit is bolded, dashed lines indicate hydrogen bonds.

=== Dyeing ===
This compound is a common hair dye. Its use is being supplanted by other aniline analogues and derivatives such as 2,5-diamino(hydroxyethylbenzene and 2,5-diaminotoluene). Other popular derivatives include tetraaminopyrimidine and indoanilines and indophenols. Derivatives of diaminopyrazole give both red and violet colours. In these applications, the nearly colourless dye precursor oxidizes to the dye.

=== Rubber antioxidant ===
PPD is easily oxidized to radical cations known as Wurster salts. For this reason, derivatives of PPD are used as antiozonants in the production of rubber products (e.g., IPPD). The substituents (naphthyl, isopropyl, etc.) affect the effectiveness of their antioxidant roles as well as their properties as skin irritants.

=== Other uses ===
A substituted form of PPD sold under the name CD-4 is also used as a developing agent in the C-41 color photographic film development process, reacting with the silver grains in the film and creating the colored dyes that form the image.

PPD is also used as a henna surrogate for temporary tattoos. Its usage can lead to severe contact dermatitis.

PPD is also used as a histological stain for lipids such as myelin.

PPD is used by lichenologists in the PD test to aid identification of lichens. PPD is used extensively as a cross-linking agent in the formation of COFs (covalent organic frameworks), which have a number of applications in dyes and aromatic compounds adsorption.

== Safety ==
The aquatic LD_{50} of PPD is 0.028 mg/L. The U.S. Environmental Protection Agency reported that in rats and mice chronically exposed to PPD in their diet, it simply depressed body weights, and no other clinical signs of toxicity were observed in several studies. One review of 31 English-language articles published between January 1992 and February 2005 that investigated the association between personal hair dye use and cancer as identified through the PubMed search engine found "at least one well-designed study with detailed exposure assessment" that observed associations between personal hair dye use and non-Hodgkin's lymphoma, multiple myeloma, acute leukemia, and bladder cancer, but those associations were not consistently observed across studies. A formal meta-analysis was not possible due to the heterogeneity of the exposure assessment across the studies.

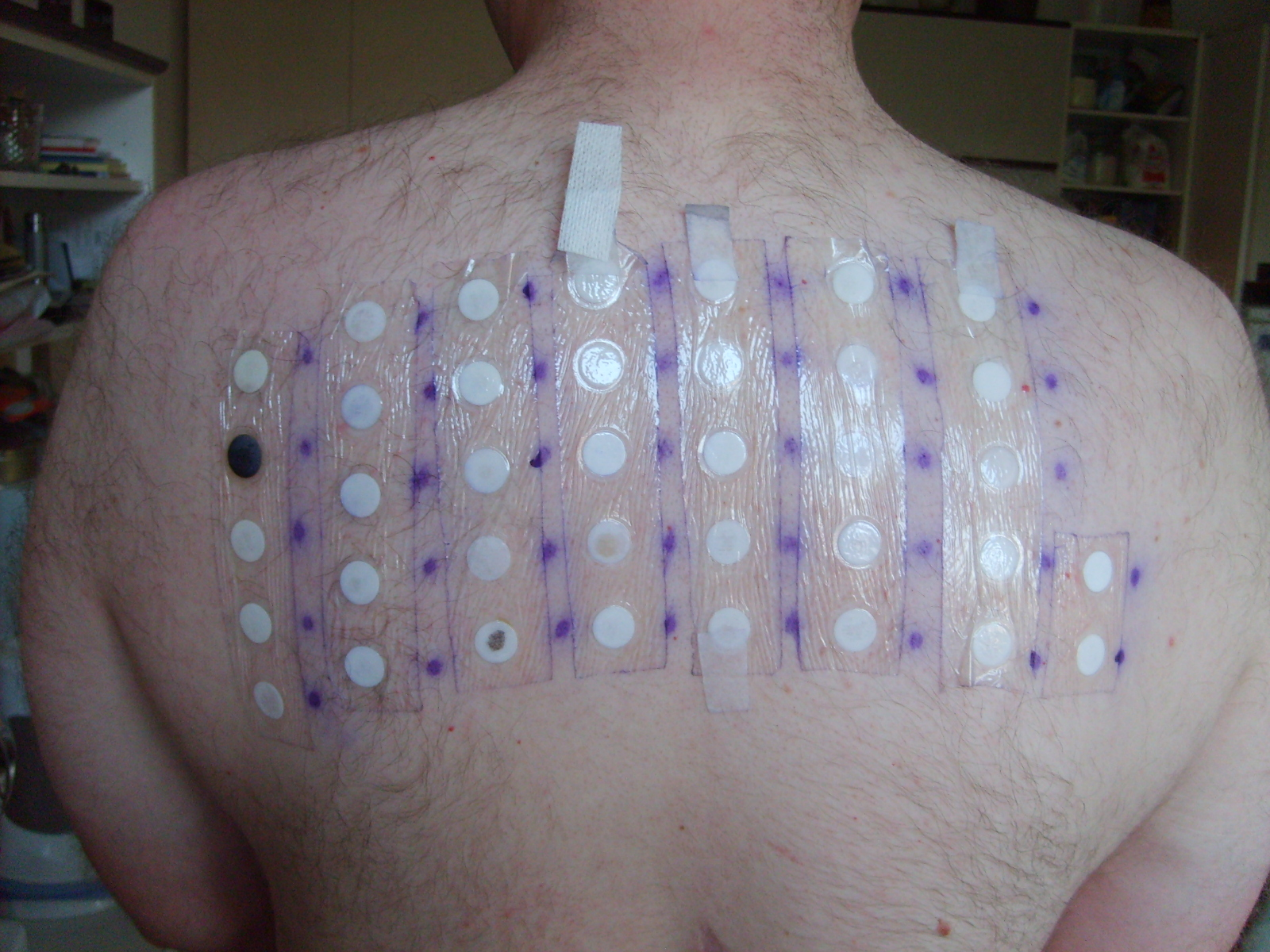
Patch test

In 2005–06, it was the tenth-most-prevalent allergen in patch tests (5.0%).

The CDC lists PPD as being a contact allergen. Exposure routes are through inhalation, skin absorption, ingestion, and skin and/or eye contact. Symptoms of exposure to PPD include throat irritation (pharynx and larynx), bronchial asthma, and sensitization dermatitis. Sensitization is a lifelong issue, which may lead to active sensitization to products, including but not limited to black clothing, various inks, hair dye, dyed fur, dyed leather, and certain photographic products. It was voted Allergen of the Year in 2006 by the American Contact Dermatitis Society.

Poisoning by PPD is rare in Western countries. In contrast, poisoning by PPD has occurred in Eastern countries, such as Pakistan, where people have committed suicide by consuming it.

== See also ==
- Henna
- Wurster's blue
