= Diacetone alcohol =

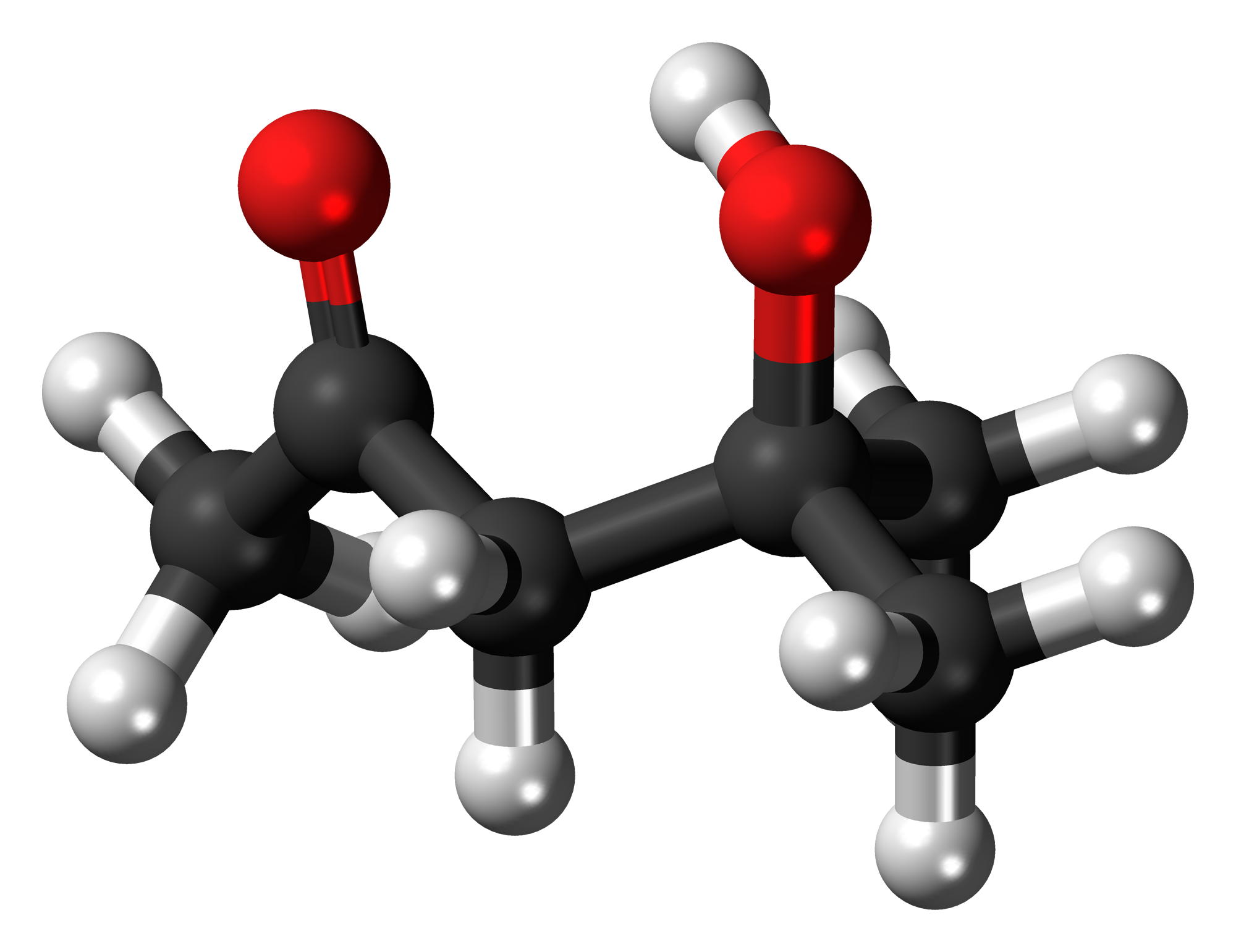

Names
- Preferred IUPAC name 4-Hydroxy-4-methylpentan-2-one
- Other names 4-Hydroxy-4-methyl-2-pentanone; 4-Hydroxy-2-keto-4-methylpentane; Diacetone alcohol

Identifiers
CAS Number	123-42-2
3D model (JSmol)	Interactive image
Beilstein Reference	1740440
ChEBI	CHEBI:55381
ChemSpider	13838151
ECHA InfoCard	100.004.207
EC Number	204-626-7
PubChem CID	31256
RTECS number	SA9100000
UNII	Q7WP157PTD
UN number	1148
CompTox Dashboard (EPA)	DTXSID6024917
- InChI: InChI=1S/C6H12O2/c1-5(7)4-6(2,3)8/h8H,4H2,1-3H3 Key: SWXVUIWOUIDPGS-UHFFFAOYSA-N; InChI=1/C6H12O2/c1-5(7)4-6(2,3)8/h8H,4H2,1-3H3 Key: SWXVUIWOUIDPGS-UHFFFAOYAN
- SMILES: CC(=O)CC(C)(C)O

Properties
Chemical formula	C_{6}H_{12}O_{2}
Molar mass	116.160 g·mol^{−1}
Appearance	Colorless liquid
Odor	Odorless
Density	0.938 g/cm^{3}
Melting point	−47 °C (−53 °F; 226 K)
Boiling point	166 °C (331 °F; 439 K)
Solubility in water	moderate
Solubility	most organic solvents
Refractive index (n_{D})	1.4235

Hazards
- Occupational safety and health (OHS/OSH)
Main hazards	Flammable
- GHS labelling
Pictograms	(GHS02: Flammable) (GHS07: Exclamation mark)
Signal word	Warning
Hazard statements	H226, H319, H335
Precautionary statements	P210, P233, P240, P241, P242, P243, P261, P264, P271, P280, P303+P361+P353, P304+P340, P305+P351+P338, P312, P337+P313, P370+P378, P403+P233, P403+P235, P405, P501
Flash point	52 °C; 125 °F; 325 K
Explosive limits	1.8–6.9%
- Lethal dose or concentration (LD, LC)
LD_{50} (median dose)	4000 mg/kg (oral, rat); 4653 mg/kg (oral, rabbit); 3950 mg/kg (oral, mouse)
- NIOSH (US health exposure limits)
PEL (Permissible)	TWA 50 ppm (240 mg/m^{3})

Related compounds
Related compounds	Acetone methyl isobutyl ketone
- Except where otherwise noted, data are given for materials in their standard state (at 25 °C [77 °F], 100 kPa). verify (what is ?) Infobox references

Diacetone alcohol is an organic compound with the formula CH_{3}C(O)CH_{2}C(OH)(CH_{3})_{2}, sometimes called DAA. This colorless liquid is a common synthetic intermediate used for the preparation of other compounds, and is also used as a solvent.

== Synthesis and reactions ==
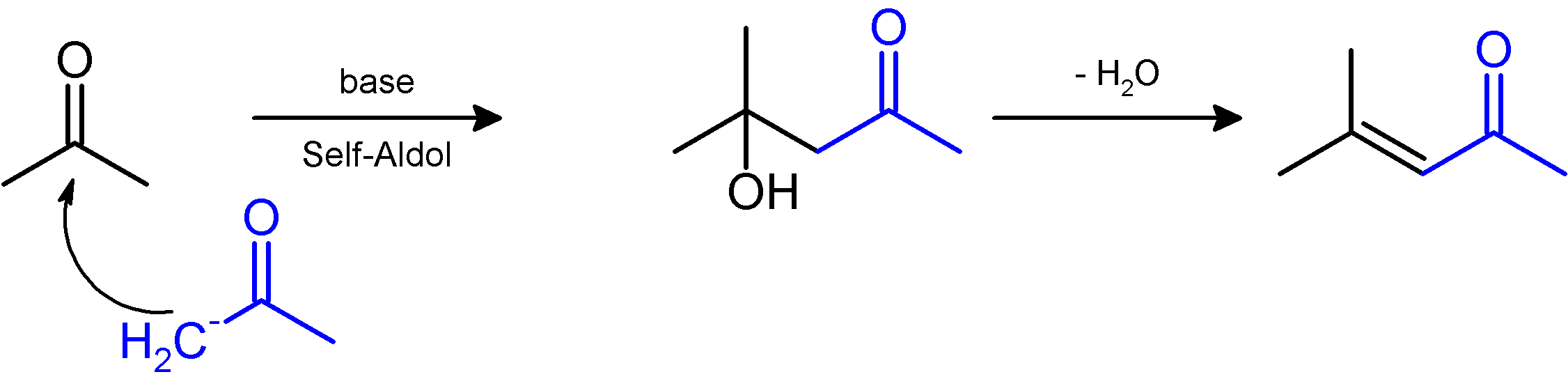

First identified by Heintz, one standard laboratory preparation of DAA entails the Ba(OH)_{2}-catalyzed condensation of two molecules of acetone.

It undergoes dehydration to give the α,β-unsaturated ketone called mesityl oxide. Hydrogenation of diacetone alcohol gives hexylene glycol. Condensation with urea gives "diacetone-monourea", i.e. the heterocycle 3,4-dihydro- 4,4,6-trimethyl-2(1H)-pyrimidone.

== Uses ==
Diacetone alcohol is used in cellulose ester lacquers, particularly of the brushing type, where it produces brilliant gloss and hard film and where its lack of odor is desirable. It is used in lacquer thinners, dopes, wood stains, wood preservatives and printing pastes; in coating compositions for paper and textiles; permanent markers; in making artificial silk and leather; in imitation gold leaf; in celluloid cements; as a preservative for animal tissue; in metal cleaning compounds; in the manufacture of photographic film; and in early hydraulic brake fluids, where it was usually mixed with an equal volume of castor oil.

== Safety ==
The LD_{50} (oral, rats) is 4 g/kg.
