= Antiozonant =

Class of chemical compounds

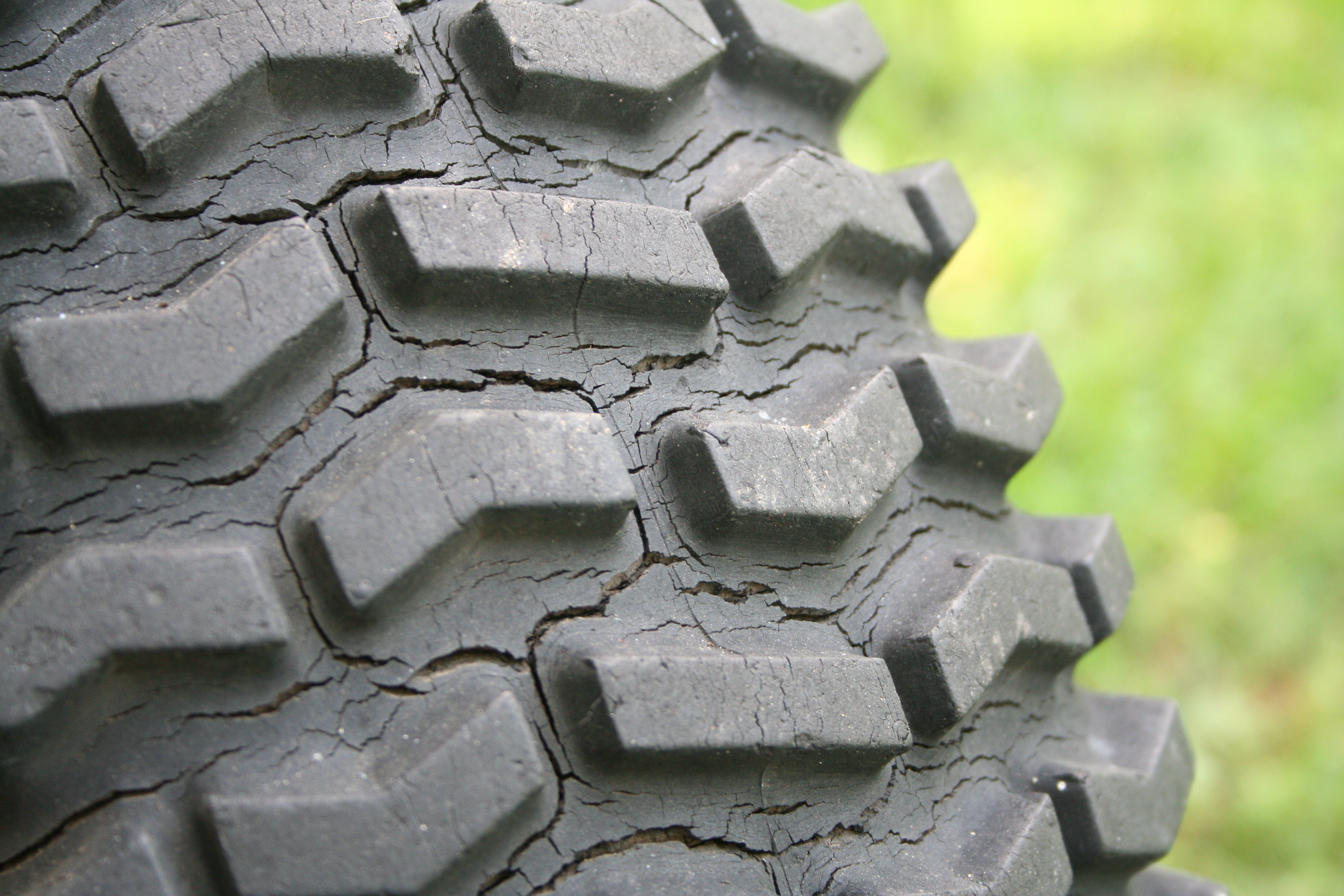
A vehicle tire showing signs of ozone cracking

An antiozonant, also known as anti-ozonant, is an organic compound that prevents or retards damage caused by ozone. The most important antiozonants are those which prevent degradation of elastomers like rubber. A number of research projects study the application of another type of antiozonants to protect plants as well as salmonids that are affected by the chemicals.

== Effect of ozone ==
The distribution of atmospheric ozone

Many elastomers are rich in unsaturated double bonds, which can react with ozone present in the air in process known as ozonolysis. This reaction breaks the polymer chains, degrading the mechanical properties of the material. The most obvious effect of this is cracking of the elastomer (ozone cracking), which is exacerbated by mechanical stress. The rate of degradation is effected both by the chemical structure of the elastomer and the amount of ozone in the environment. Elastomers which are rich in double bonds, such as natural rubber, polybutadiene, styrene-butadiene rubber and nitrile rubber are the most sensitive to degradation, whereas butyl rubber, polychloroprene, EPDM and Viton are more resistant. Ground-level ozone is naturally present, but it is also a product of smog and thus degradation is faster in areas of high air pollution. All of these factors make vehicle tires particularly vulnerable, as they contain a high level of unsaturated groups, operate in areas prone to air pollution and are subjected to significant mechanical stresses.

== Protection of elastomers ==
Antiozonants are used as additives in tire manufacturing to retard the effects of ozone.

The most common antiozonants for elastomers are N,N′-substituted p-phenylenediamines (PPD) which can be categorized in three types:

- Dialkyl p-Phenylenediamines, such as N,N'-Di-2-butyl-1,4-phenylenediamine
- Alkyl-aryl p-Phenylenediamines, such as 6PPD or IPPD
- Diaryl p-Phenylenediamines, like DPPD

Other classes include:

- Styrenated phenol (SPH), styrenated and alkylated phenol (SAPH)
- Hydrocarbon waxes which create a surface barrier, preventing contact with ozone: paraffin wax, microcrystalline wax.

== Protection of plants ==
For the protection of plants like winter wheat or maize Ethylene diurea (EDU) has been used successfully as antiozonant.

== See also ==
- Stabilizer (chemistry)
- Stabilizers for polymers
- Antioxidant
