= Acetone (data page) =

Chemical data page

This page provides supplementary chemical data on acetone.

== Material Safety Data Sheet ==
The handling of this chemical may incur notable safety precautions. It is highly recommended that you seek the Material Safety Datasheet (MSDS) for this chemical from a reliable source and follow its directions.

- Mallinckrodt Baker
- Science Stuff

== Structure and properties ==
Structure and properties
Dielectric constant, ε_{r}	20.7 ε_{0} at 25 °C
Surface tension	26.2 dyn/cm at 0° 23.7 dyn/cm at 20 °C

== Thermodynamic properties ==
Phase behavior
Triple point	178.5 K (−94.3 °C), ? Pa
Std entropy change of fusion, Δ_{fus}S^{~~o~~}	+32.3 J/(mol·K)
Std entropy change of vaporization, Δ_{vap}S^{~~o~~}	95 J/(mol·K)
Liquid properties
Standard molar entropy, S^{~~o~~}_{liquid}	200.4 J/(mol K)
Enthalpy of combustion, Δ_{c}H^{~~o~~}	–1785.7 kJ/mol
Gas properties
van der Waals' constants	a = 1409.4 L^{2} kPa/mol^{2} b = 0.0994 liter per mole

== Vapor pressure of liquid ==
P in mm Hg	1	10	40	100	400	760	1520	3800	7600	15200	30400	45600
T in °C	–59.4	–31.1	–9.4	7.7	39.5	56.5	78.6	113.0	144.5	181.0	214.5	—

Table data obtained from CRC Handbook of Chemistry and Physics 44th ed.

Vapor pressure of acetone based on formula, $\scriptstyle P_{mmHg} = 10^{7.02447 - \frac {1161.0} {224+T}}$ from Lange's Handbook of Chemistry, 10th ed.

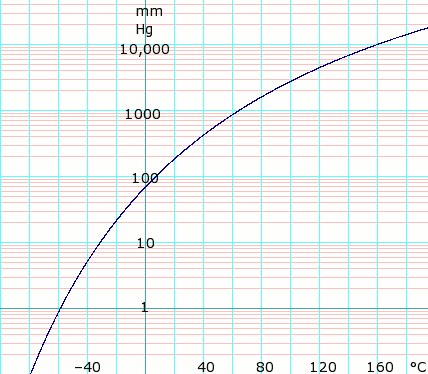
vapor pressure of acetone (log scale) based on formula, $\scriptstyle \log_{10} P_{mmHg} = 7.02447 - \frac {1161.0} {224+T}$ from Lange's Handbook of Chemistry, 10th ed.

== Distillation data ==
Vapor-liquid Equilibrium of Acetone/water; P = 760 mmHg
BP Temp. °C	% by mole acetone
BP Temp. °C	liquid	vapor
100.00	0.0	0.0
87.8	1.0	33.5
83.0	2.3	46.2
76.5	4.1	58.5
75.38	5.0	63.1
68.76	10.0	73.1
66.2	12.0	75.6
63.98	20.0	79.2
61.84	30.0	82.0
60.73	40.0	83.4
59.87	50.0	84.8
59.29	60.0	85.8
58.52	70.0	87.4
57.65	80.0	89.4
57.1	85.0	91.8
56.65	90.0	93.8
56.36	95.0	96.3
56.09	100.0	100.0

Vapor-liquid Equilibrium of Acetone/Methanol; P = 101.325 kPa
BP Temp. °C	% by mole methanol
BP Temp. °C	liquid	vapor
55.67	7.0	8.2
55.43	13.3	14.4
55.31	18.1	18.8
55.24	21.7	21.8
55.25	22.7	22.6
55.30	26.5	25.5
55.39	34.0	31.1
55.74	40.6	35.6
55.96	44.6	38.2
56.15	48.1	40.6
56.90	59.3	48.6
57.05	60.6	49.6
57.29	63.1	51.5
57.69	67.6	55.0
58.32	71.9	59.0
58.49	73.7	60.8
58.97	77.1	64.3
59.57	80.5	68.1
60.41	84.9	73.5
61.53	90.0	80.9
62.21	92.6	85.2
62.79	94.7	89.0
63.69	97.6	94.7

Vapor-liquid Equilibrium of Acetone/Ethanol; P = 760 mm Hg
BP Temp. °C	% by mole acetone
BP Temp. °C	liquid	vapor
78.3	0	0
76.4	3.3	11.1
74.0	7.8	21.6
70.8	14.9	34.5
69.1	19.5	41.0
65.6	31.6	53.4
63.4	41.4	61.4
61.3	53.2	69.7
59.0	69.1	79.6
57.3	85.2	89.6
56.1	100.0	100.0

== Spectral data ==
UV-Vis
λ_{max}
280 nm
Extinction coefficient, ε
12.4 L/(mol·cm) @ 280 nm
IR
Major absorption bands

(liquid film)
Wave number	Transmittance
3414 cm^{−1}	78%
3005 cm^{−1}	66%
2966 cm^{−1}	74%
2925 cm^{−1}	77%
1749 cm^{−1}	52%
1715 cm^{−1}	4%
1434 cm^{−1}	49%
1421 cm^{−1}	47%
1363 cm^{−1}	13%
1223 cm^{−1}	12%
1093 cm^{−1}	68%
903 cm^{−1}	81%
531 cm^{−1}	36%

NMR
Proton NMR
(CDCl_{3}, 300 MHz) δ 2.16 (s, 6H)
Carbon-13 NMR
(CDCl_{3}, 25 MHz) δ 206.6, 30.8
Other NMR data

MS
Masses of
main fragments
