= Bloom (phase) =

Chemical event

In polymer chemistry, materials science, and food science, bloom refers to the migration of one component of a solid mixture to the surface of an article. The process is an example of phase separation or phase aggregation.

== Materials science ==
EU food contact material symbol: used for marking materials intended to come into contact with food in the European Union as defined in regulation (EC) No 1935/2004

Blooming is commonly encountered in polymer additives such as stabilizers. Many polymers are essentially pure hydrocarbons whereas additives are often significantly more polar, this results their being forced out via hydrophobic forces. The blooming of additives may be desirable or undesirable. For example, the migration of antioxidants to the polymer surface may help it resist degradation. Conversely, the leaching of additives from packaging materials into foods, or the blooming of additives in biomedical devices is often of high concern. Regulations exist in many counties that require both the levels of blooming and the materials involved to be of a safe level, for example the international symbol for materials approved for food contact is a wine glass and a fork symbol.

=== Sulfur bloom ===
Sulfur bloom refers to the migration of sulfur, usually as S_{8}, to the surface of a rubber article either before or after vulcanization. Blooming is undesirable in rubber processing. When sulfur bloom appears before vulcanization, the rubber is deprived of the crosslinking agent. Sulfur bloom after vulcanization indicates incomplete vulcanization. To prevent sulfur blooming, rubber industry utilizes amorphous, polymeric forms of sulfur referred to as "insoluble sulfur" for sulfur vulcanisation. It remains insoluble in uncured rubber, thereby preventing migration and blooming. In rubber processing, ingredients other than sulfur can also "bloom", including antioxidants, fatty acids, and accelerators.

== Food science ==
=== Chocolate bloom ===
Chocolate bloom refers two types of whitish coating that can appear on the surface of chocolate: fat bloom, caused by changes in the fat crystals in the chocolate; and sugar bloom, due to crystals formed by the action of moisture on the sugar. Chocolate that has "bloomed" remains edible but may have an unappetizing appearance and texture.

== See also ==
- Efflorescence
