= Functional analog (chemistry) =

In chemistry and pharmacology, functional analogs are chemical compounds that have similar physical, chemical, biochemical, or pharmacological properties. Functional analogs are not necessarily structural analogs with a similar chemical structure. An example of pharmacological functional analogs are morphine, heroin and fentanyl, which have the same mechanism of action, but fentanyl is structurally quite different from the other two with significant variance in dosage.

Morphine

Heroin

Fentanyl

== See also ==
- Federal Analogue Act
