= N,N'-Di-2-butyl-1,4-phenylenediamine =

N,N′-Di-2-butyl-1,4-phenylenediamine

Names
- Preferred IUPAC name N,N′-Di(butan-2-yl)benzene-1,4-diamine
- Other names: N,N′-Di-sec-butyl-1,4-phenylenediamine; N,N′-di-sec-butylbenzene-1,4-diamine; N,N′-bis(1-methylpropyl)-1,4-benzenediamine

Identifiers
CAS Number	101-96-2
3D model (JSmol)	Interactive image
ChemSpider	7308
ECHA InfoCard	100.002.721
PubChem CID	7589
UNII	76251WU9I2
CompTox Dashboard (EPA)	DTXSID7024956
- InChI: InChI=1S/C14H24N2/c1-5-11(3)15-13-7-9-14(10-8-13)16-12(4)6-2/h7-12,15-16H,5-6H2,1-4H3 Key: FSWDLYNGJBGFJH-UHFFFAOYSA-N; InChI=1/C14H24N2/c1-5-11(3)15-13-7-9-14(10-8-13)16-12(4)6-2/h7-12,15-16H,5-6H2,1-4H3 Key: FSWDLYNGJBGFJH-UHFFFAOYAY
- SMILES: CCC(C)Nc1ccc(cc1)NC(C)CC

Properties
Chemical formula	C_{14}H_{24}N_{2}
Molar mass	220.360 g·mol^{−1}
Density	0.942 g/mL at 20 °C
- Except where otherwise noted, data are given for materials in their standard state (at 25 °C [77 °F], 100 kPa). verify (what is ?) Infobox references

N,N′-Di-2-butyl-1,4-phenylenediamine is an aromatic amine used industrially as an antioxidant to prevent degradation of turbine oils, transformer oils, hydraulic fluids, lubricants, waxes, and greases. It is particularly effective for hydrocarbon products produced by cracking or pyrolysis, which are characterized by high alkene content. It is also used as an polymerisation inhibitor in production of various vinyl monomers such as acrylates.

N,N′-Di-2-butyl-1,4-phenylenediamine has the appearance of a red liquid. It is a skin sensitizer and can be absorbed through skin. It is toxic.

N,N′-Di-2-butyl-1,4-phenylenediamine is the active component of e.g. Innospec AO-22, AO-24, Westco AO-29, and VANLUBE antioxidant mixtures, and Santoflex 44PD inhibitor.
