= Copper(II) stearate =

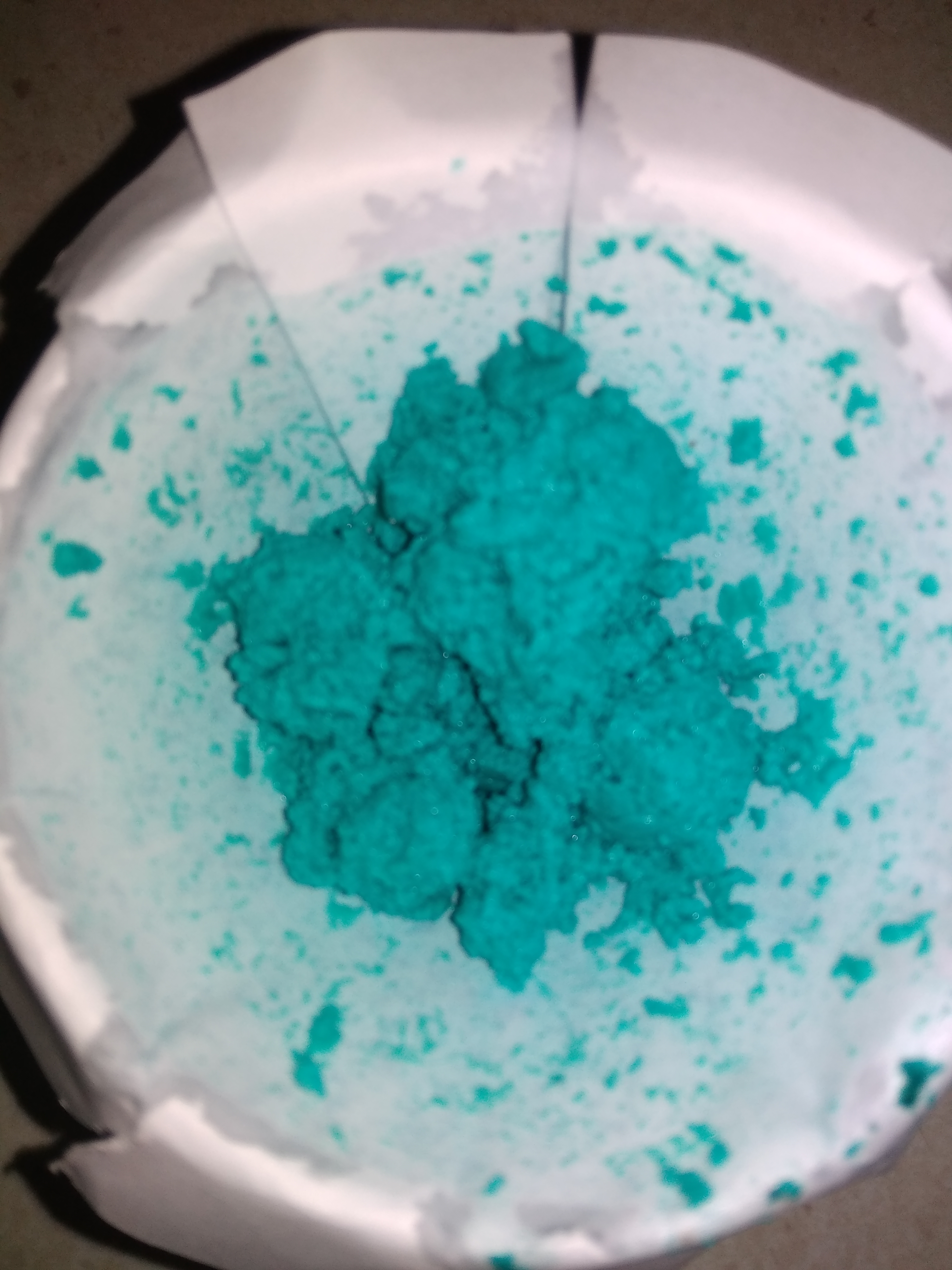
- Copper(II) stearate

Names
- Other names: Copper dioctadecanoate; Copper distearate; Cupric octadecanoate; Cupric stearate

Identifiers
CAS Number	660-60-6
3D model (JSmol)	Interactive image
ChemSpider	84453
ECHA InfoCard	100.010.493
EC Number	211-540-3
PubChem CID	93553
UNII	Z3VAO22R1R
CompTox Dashboard (EPA)	2060963
- InChI: InChI=1S/2C18H36O2.Cu/c2*1-2-3-4-5-6-7-8-9-10-11-12-13-14-15-16-17-18(19)20;/h2*2-17H2,1H3,(H,19,20);/q;;+2/p-2 Key: PEVZEFCZINKUCG-UHFFFAOYSA-L
- SMILES: [Cu+2].[O-]C(=O)CCCCCCCCCCCCCCCCC.[O-]C(=O)CCCCCCCCCCCCCCCCC

Properties
Chemical formula	Cu(C_{17}H_{35}COO)_{2}
Molar mass	630.48
Appearance	blue-green amorphous substance
Density	1.10 g/cm^{3}
Melting point	112 °C (234 °F; 385 K)
Boiling point	250 °C (482 °F; 523 K)
Solubility in water	insoluble
Solubility	insoluble in ethanol, ether soluble in pyridine

Hazards
- GHS labelling
Pictograms	(GHS07: Exclamation mark)
Signal word	Warning
Hazard statements	H315, H319, H335
Precautionary statements	P261, P280, P305, P338, P351

Related compounds
Related compounds	Mercury(II) stearate, Cobalt(II) stearate
- Except where otherwise noted, data are given for materials in their standard state (at 25 °C [77 °F], 100 kPa). Infobox references

Copper(II) stearate is a metal-organic compound, a salt of copper and stearic acid with the formula Cu(C_{17}H_{35}COO)_{2}. The compound is classified as a metallic soap, i.e. a metal derivative of a fatty acid.

== Properties ==
The compound is stable and non-reactive under normal conditions.

When trying to ignite, copper stearate first melts and then begins to burn with a green (at the base) flame, then it quickly turns black due to the formation of cupric oxide:

Cu(C_{17}H_{35}CO_{2})_{2} + 52 O_{2} → CuO↓ + 36 CO_{2}↑ + 35 H_{2}O↑

== Synthesis ==
Copper(II) stearate can be prepared by an exchange reaction involving sodium stearate and copper sulfate:

CuSO_{4} + 2 C_{17}H_{35}CO_{2}Na → Cu(C_{17}H_{35}CO_{2})_{2}↓ + Na_{2}SO_{4}

== Uses ==
Copper(II) stearate is used in the production of anti-fouling paint and varnish materials.

It is also used as a component in casting bronze sculptures and serves as a catalyst for the decomposition of hydroperoxides.
