= Cerium stearate =

Names
- Other names: Cerium(3+) octadecanoate; Cerous stearate; Cerium tristearate

Identifiers
CAS Number	14536-00-6
3D model (JSmol)	Interactive image
ChemSpider	145318
ECHA InfoCard	100.035.048
EC Number	233-324-8
PubChem CID	165821
UNII	4S541N00JC
CompTox Dashboard (EPA)	1064954
- InChI: InChI=1S/3C18H36O2.Ce/c3*1-2-3-4-5-6-7-8-9-10-11-12-13-14-15-16-17-18(19)20;/h3*2-17H2,1H3,(H,19,20);/q;;;+3/p-3 Key: BTVVNGIPFPKDHO-UHFFFAOYSA-K
- SMILES: CCCCCCCCCCCCCCCCCC(=O)[O-].CCCCCCCCCCCCCCCCCC(=O)[O-].CCCCCCCCCCCCCCCCCC(=O)[O-].[Ce+3]

Properties
Chemical formula	C_{54}H_{105}CeO_{6}
Molar mass	989.69
Appearance	white powder
Density	g/cm^{3}
Melting point	120 °C (248 °F; 393 K)
Solubility in water	insoluble

Hazards
- GHS labelling
Precautionary statements	P262, P280, P304+P340, P305+P351+P338, P403+P233, P501
- Except where otherwise noted, data are given for materials in their standard state (at 25 °C [77 °F], 100 kPa). Infobox references

Cerium stearate is a metal-organic compound with the approximate chemical formula (C_{17}H_{35}CO_{2})_{3}Ce. The compound is classified as a metallic soap, i.e. a metal derivative of a fatty acid.

== Synthesis ==
Cerium stearate is synthesized from the reaction of cerium oxide with stearic acid in an inert atmosphere at temperatures between 100 and 200 °C. It can also be obtained by the reaction of cerium nitrate and potassium stearate.

== Physical properties ==
The compound forms a white powder which is insoluble in water.

== Uses ==
The compound, which is a metallic soap, is used as a lubricant, antioxidant, and antifoaming agent. Other uses include as a catalyst in the synthesis of polymers and as a stabilizer in the production of plastics.
