= Manganese stearate =

Names
- Other names Manganese(II) stearate, manganese distearate, manganese(2+) dioctadecanoate

Identifiers
CAS Number	3353-05-7
3D model (JSmol)	Interactive image
ChemSpider	141189
ECHA InfoCard	100.020.110
EC Number	222-119-9
PubChem CID	160684
UNII	0276L2MSQ6
CompTox Dashboard (EPA)	4062989
- InChI: InChI=1S/2C18H36O2.Mn/c2*1-2-3-4-5-6-7-8-9-10-11-12-13-14-15-16-17-18(19)20;/h2*2-17H2,1H3,(H,19,20);/q;;+2/p-2 Key: SZINCDDYCOIOJQ-UHFFFAOYSA-L
- SMILES: CCCCCCCCCCCCCCCCCC(=O)[O-].CCCCCCCCCCCCCCCCCC(=O)[O-].[Mn+2]

Properties
Chemical formula	C_{36}H_{70}MnO_{4}
Molar mass	621.89
Appearance	Pale pink powder
Density	g/cm^{3}
Boiling point	359.4 °C (678.9 °F; 632.5 K)
Solubility in water	insoluble

Hazards
- GHS labelling
Signal word	Warning
Hazard statements	H302, H312, H315, H319, H332, H335
Flash point	162.4 °C (324.3 °F; 435.5 K)
- Except where otherwise noted, data are given for materials in their standard state (at 25 °C [77 °F], 100 kPa). Infobox references

Manganese stearate is a metal-organic compound, a salt of manganese and stearic acid with the chemical formula (C_{17}H_{35}CO_{2})_{2}Mn. The compound is classified as a metallic soap, i.e. a metal derivative of a fatty acid. The pure solid is white, but some impure samples appear brownish.

== Synthesis and uses ==
Manganese stearate is synthesized by the reaction of sodium stearate with manganese chloride.

It is a precursor to Mn-doped zinc selenide phosphors.

Also as an oxidant additive for oxo-biodegradable polymers (for example, high-density polyethylene).
