= Tin(II) stearate =

Names
- Other names Stannous octadecanoate, tin distearate

Identifiers
CAS Number	6994-59-8
3D model (JSmol)	Interactive image
ChemSpider	2016467
ECHA InfoCard	100.027.515
EC Number	231-570-0
PubChem CID	2734723
CompTox Dashboard (EPA)	DTXSID60220222
- InChI: InChI=1S/C18H36O2.Sn/c1-2-3-4-5-6-7-8-9-10-11-12-13-14-15-16-17-18(19)20;/h2-17H2,1H3,(H,19,20); Key: JIVYAYWWEQOVRW-UHFFFAOYSA-N
- SMILES: CCCCCCCCCCCCCCCCCC(=O)O.[Sn]

Properties
Chemical formula	C_{18}H_{36}SnO_{2}
Molar mass	403.2
Appearance	colorless (white) crystals
Density	1.05 g/cm^{3}
Melting point	90 °C (194 °F; 363 K)
Solubility in water	insoluble
- Except where otherwise noted, data are given for materials in their standard state (at 25 °C [77 °F], 100 kPa). Infobox references

Tin(II) stearate is a metal-organic compound with the chemical formula C_{18}H_{36}SnO_{2}. The compound is classified as a metallic soap, i.e. a metal derivative of a fatty acid (stearic acid).

== Physical properties ==
Tin(II) stearate forms colorless (white) crystals.

The compound is insoluble in water.

== Chemical properties ==
Tin(II) stearate reacts with sodium hydroxide solution or hydrochloric acid to form the tin(II) chloride or tin(II) chloride hydroxide.

== Uses ==
The compound is used in the pharmaceuticals and cosmetics industries as a thickener, film-forming polymer, and release agent.
