= Nickel(II) stearate =

Names
- Other names Nickel distearate, nickel dioctadecanoate, nickel(2+) octadecanoate

Identifiers
CAS Number	2223-95-2
3D model (JSmol)	Interactive image
ChemSpider	141143
ECHA InfoCard	100.017.041
EC Number	218-744-1
PubChem CID	160624
CompTox Dashboard (EPA)	90890558
- InChI: InChI=1S/2C18H36O2.Ni/c2*1-2-3-4-5-6-7-8-9-10-11-12-13-14-15-16-17-18(19)20;/h2*2-17H2,1H3,(H,19,20);/q;;+2/p-2 Key: JMWUYEFBFUCSAK-UHFFFAOYSA-L
- SMILES: CCCCCCCCCCCCCCCCCC(=O)[O-].CCCCCCCCCCCCCCCCCC(=O)[O-].[Ni+2]

Properties
Chemical formula	C_{36}H_{70}NiO_{4}
Molar mass	625.63
Appearance	green powder
Density	1.13 g/cm^{3}
Melting point	100 °C (212 °F; 373 K)
Boiling point	359.4 °C (678.9 °F; 632.5 K)
Solubility in water	insoluble

Hazards
- GHS labelling
Pictograms	(GHS08: Health hazard) (GHS09: Environmental hazard)
Signal word	Danger
Hazard statements	H317, H334, H341, H350, H360, H372, H410
Flash point	162.4 °C (324.3 °F; 435.5 K)
- Except where otherwise noted, data are given for materials in their standard state (at 25 °C [77 °F], 100 kPa). Infobox references

Nickel(II) stearate is a metal-organic compound, a salt of nickel and stearic acid with the chemical formula C_{36}H_{70}NiO_{4}. The compound is classified as a metallic soap, i.e. a metal derivative of a fatty acid. The compound is harmful if swallowed and may cause skin sensitization.

== Synthesis ==
An exchange reaction of sodium stearate and nickel dichloride:

$$\mathsf{ NiCl_2 + 2C_{17}H_{35}COONa \ \xrightarrow{}\ Ni(C_{17}H_{35}COO)_2\downarrow + 2NaCl }$$

== Physical properties ==
Nickel(II) stearate forms a green powder.

The compound is insoluble in water, methanol, ethanol, or ether, soluble in carbon tetrachloride and pyridine, slightly soluble in acetone.

== Uses ==
The compound is used as a lubricant and in various industrial applications.
