= Lanthanum stearate =

Names
- Other names Lanthanum(III) stearate; lanthanum(3+) octadecanoate

Identifiers
| CAS Number | 14741-67-4 |
| 3D model (JSmol) | Interactive image |
| ChemSpider | 14626789 |
| EC Number | 238-806-1 |
| PubChem CID | 19854957 |
- InChI: InChI=1S/3C18H36O2.La/c3*1-2-3-4-5-6-7-8-9-10-11-12-13-14-15-16-17-18(19)20;/h3*2-17H2,1H3,(H,19,20);/q;;;+3/p-3 Key: RWXOJQGSZWUIEJ-UHFFFAOYSA-K
- SMILES: CCCCCCCCCCCCCCCCCC(=O)[O-].CCCCCCCCCCCCCCCCCC(=O)[O-].CCCCCCCCCCCCCCCCCC(=O)[O-].[La+3]

Properties
| Chemical formula | C_{54}H_{105}LaO_{6} |
| Molar mass | 989.3 |
| Appearance | white powder |
| Solubility in water | insoluble |
- Except where otherwise noted, data are given for materials in their standard state (at 25 °C [77 °F], 100 kPa). Infobox references

Lanthanum stearate is a metal-organic compound, a salt of lanthanum and stearic acid with the chemical formula La(C_{18}H_{35}O_{2})_{3}. The compound is classified as a metallic soap, i.e. a metal derivative of a fatty acid.

== Physical properties ==
The compound forms a white powder that is soluble in benzene.

== Uses ==
Lanthanum stearate is mainly used as a nucleating agent for plastics degradation and heat stabilizer for PVC.
