= Strontium stearate =

Names
- Other names strontium distearate, strontium dioctadecanoate

Identifiers
CAS Number	10196-69-7
3D model (JSmol)	Interactive image
ChemSpider	145338
PubChem CID	517349
- InChI: InChI=1S/2C18H36O2.Sr/c2*1-2-3-4-5-6-7-8-9-10-11-12-13-14-15-16-17-18(19)20;/h2*2-17H2,1H3,(H,19,20);/q;;+2/p-2 Key: FRKHZXHEZFADLA-UHFFFAOYSA-L
- SMILES: CCCCCCCCCCCCCCCCCC(=O)[O-].CCCCCCCCCCCCCCCCCC(=O)[O-].[Sr+2]

Properties
Chemical formula	Sr(C_{18}H_{35}O_{2})_{2}
Molar mass	654.56
Appearance	white powder
Density	1.11 g/cm^{3}
Melting point	130–140 °C (266–284 °F; 403–413 K)
Solubility in water	insoluble
- Except where otherwise noted, data are given for materials in their standard state (at 25 °C [77 °F], 100 kPa). Infobox references

Strontium stearate is a metal-organic compound, a salt of strontium and stearic acid with the chemical formula Sr(C_{18}H_{35}O_{2})_{2}. The compound is classified as a metallic soap, i.e. a metal derivative of a fatty acid.

== Synthesis ==
A reaction of strontium hydroxide with stearic acid.

== Physical properties ==
The compound forms white powder. Insoluble in alcohol, soluble (forms gel) in aliphatic and aromatic hydrocarbons.

== Uses ==
Strontium stearate is used in grease and wax compounding.

It is also used as a lubricant to improve the flow characteristics of polyolefin resins.
