= Caesium stearate =

Identifiers
CAS Number	14912-91-5
3D model (JSmol)	Interactive image
PubChem CID	23720211
- InChI: InChI=1S/C18H36O2.Cs/c1-2-3-4-5-6-7-8-9-10-11-12-13-14-15-16-17-18(19)20;/h2-17H2,1H3,(H,19,20);/q;+1/p-1 Key: WLZGEDNSZCPRCJ-UHFFFAOYSA-M
- SMILES: CCCCCCCCCCCCCCCCCC(=O)[O-].[Cs+]

Properties
Chemical formula	C_{18}H_{35}CsO_{2}
Molar mass	416.37 g/mol
Solubility in water	soluble in hot water
- Except where otherwise noted, data are given for materials in their standard state (at 25 °C [77 °F], 100 kPa). Infobox references

Caesium stearate is a metal-organic compound – a salt of caesium and stearic acid- with the chemical formula C_{18}H_{35}CsO_{2}. The compound is classified as a metallic soap, i.e. a metal derivative of a fatty acid.

== Preparation ==
Caesium stearate can be prepared by the reaction of caesium carbonate with stearic acid.
