= Magnesium laurate =

Names
- Other names Magnesium dodecanoate, magnesium dilaurate

Identifiers
CAS Number	4040-48-6 incorrect SMILES
3D model (JSmol)	Interactive image
ChemSpider	55258
ECHA InfoCard	100.021.571
EC Number	223-727-7
PubChem CID	14496654
UNII	MNF86GDH3F
CompTox Dashboard (EPA)	DTXSID40890583
- InChI: InChI=1S/2C12H24O2.Mg/c2*1-2-3-4-5-6-7-8-9-10-11-12(13)14;/h2*2-11H2,1H3,(H,13,14);/q;;+2/p-2 Key: BJZBHTNKDCBDNQ-UHFFFAOYSA-L
- SMILES: CCCCCCCCCCCC(=O)[O-].CCCCCCCCCCCC(=O)[O-].[Mg+2]

Properties
Chemical formula	C_{24}H_{46}MgO_{4}
Molar mass	422.9
Appearance	white waxy solid
Melting point	43.8 °C (110.8 °F; 316.9 K)
Boiling point	296.1 °C (565.0 °F; 569.2 K)
Solubility in water	Sparingly soluble
- Except where otherwise noted, data are given for materials in their standard state (at 25 °C [77 °F], 100 kPa). Infobox references

Magnesium laurate is a metal-organic compound with the chemical formula C_{24}H_{46}MgO_{4}. The compound is classified as a metallic soap, i.e. a metal derivative of a fatty acid (lauric acid). Like many metallic soaps, it is only sparingly soluble in water.

Magnesium laurate is used in the food industry as a binder, emulsifier, and anticaking agent.

== Related ==
- Magnesium stearate
