= Lead(II) laurate =

Names
- Other names Lead(II) dodecanoate

Identifiers
CAS Number	15773-55-4
3D model (JSmol)	Interactive image
ECHA InfoCard	100.036.230
EC Number	239-869-8
PubChem CID	139203580
CompTox Dashboard (EPA)	DTXSID80890764
- InChI: InChI=1S/2C12H24O2.Pb/c2*1-2-3-4-5-6-7-8-9-10-11-12(13)14;/h2*2-11H2,1H3,(H,13,14);/q;;+2/p-2 Key: YDKNIVGNQVFYPR-UHFFFAOYSA-L
- SMILES: CCCCCCCCCCCC(=O)[O-].CCCCCCCCCCCC(=O)[O-].[Pb+2]

Properties
Chemical formula	Pb(C_{11}H_{23}COO)_{2}
Molar mass	606
Appearance	White solid
Melting point	104.7 °C (220.5 °F; 377.8 K)
Solubility in water	Insoluble
- Except where otherwise noted, data are given for materials in their standard state (at 25 °C [77 °F], 100 kPa). Infobox references

Lead(II) laurate is a metal-organic compound with the chemical formula Pb(O_{2}C(CH_{2})_{10}CH_{3})_{2}. It is classified as a metallic soap, i.e. a metal derivative of a fatty acid. Like most soaps, it does not dissolve in water. Lead soaps have been used as stabilizers and plasticizers in PVC.

== Preparation ==
Lead soaps are usually prepared by combining lead(II) oxide with molten fatty acid. An idealized equation is:

PbO + RCO_{2}H → Pb(O_{2}CR)_{2} + H_{2}O

Lead carboxylates, which would include lead(II) laurate, have complex structures.
