= Lanthanum laurate =

Names
- Other names Lanthanum dodecanoate

Identifiers
3D model (JSmol)	Interactive image
ChemSpider	65792753
PubChem CID	129696023
- InChI: InChI=1S/3C12H24O2.La/c3*1-2-3-4-5-6-7-8-9-10-11-12(13)14;/h3*2-11H2,1H3,(H,13,14); Key: OOLWJPLRSMFEMM-UHFFFAOYSA-N
- SMILES: CCCCCCCCCCCC(=O)O.CCCCCCCCCCCC(=O)O.CCCCCCCCCCCC(=O)O.[La]

Properties
Chemical formula	C_{36}H_{72}LaO_{6}
Molar mass	739.871 g·mol^{−1}
Solubility in water	Insoluble
- Except where otherwise noted, data are given for materials in their standard state (at 25 °C [77 °F], 100 kPa). Infobox references

Lanthanum laurate is a metal-organic compound with the chemical formula C_{36}H_{72}LaO_{6}. The compound is classified as a metallic soap, i.e. a metal derivative of a fatty acid (lauric acid).
