= Zinc laurate =

Names
- Other names zinc dodecanoate

Identifiers
CAS Number	2452-01-9
3D model (JSmol)	Interactive image
ChemSpider	16228
ECHA InfoCard	100.017.744
EC Number	291-199-5
PubChem CID	17144
UNII	4YOP58Y695
CompTox Dashboard (EPA)	DTXSID0062428
- InChI: InChI=1S/2C12H24O2.Zn/c2*1-2-3-4-5-6-7-8-9-10-11-12(13)14;/h2*2-11H2,1H3,(H,13,14);/q;;+2/p-2 Key: GPYYEEJOMCKTPR-UHFFFAOYSA-L
- SMILES: CCCCCCCCCCCC(=O)[O-].CCCCCCCCCCCC(=O)[O-].[Zn+2]

Properties
Chemical formula	C_{24}H_{46}O_{4}Zn
Molar mass	464.0
Appearance	white powder
Melting point	129 °C (264 °F; 402 K)
Solubility in water	Insoluble
- Except where otherwise noted, data are given for materials in their standard state (at 25 °C [77 °F], 100 kPa). Infobox references

Zinc laurate is a metal-organic compound with the chemical formula C_{24}H_{46}ZnO_{4}. It is classified as a metallic soap, i.e. a metal derivative of a fatty acid (lauric acid).

== Physical properties ==
Zinc laurate forms a white powder, has a slightly waxy odor. It is insoluble in water.

== Use ==
Zinc laurate is used in the personal care and cosmetics industry as an anticaking agent, dry binder, viscosity increasing agent.
