= Mercury(II) stearate =

Names
- Other names: Mercuric stearate; Mercury distearate; Mercury dioctadecanoate

Identifiers
CAS Number	645-99-8
3D model (JSmol)	Interactive image
ChemSpider	62735
ECHA InfoCard	100.010.418
EC Number	211-458-8
PubChem CID	69531
UNII	AZ2X2WK6RN
CompTox Dashboard (EPA)	70214758
- InChI: InChI=1S/2C18H36O2.Hg/c2*1-2-3-4-5-6-7-8-9-10-11-12-13-14-15-16-17-18(19)20;/h2*2-17H2,1H3,(H,19,20);/q;;+2/p-2 Key: RRFMRVBJWLMSAB-UHFFFAOYSA-L
- SMILES: CCCCCCCCCCCCCCCCCC(=O)[O-].CCCCCCCCCCCCCCCCCC(=O)[O-].[Hg+2]

Properties
Chemical formula	Hg(C_{18}H_{35}O_{2})_{2}
Molar mass	767.544 g·mol^{−1}
Appearance	yellow wax
Melting point	112.2 °C (234.0 °F; 385.3 K)
Boiling point	359.4 °C (678.9 °F; 632.5 K)
Solubility in water	insoluble
Solubility	Soluble in fatty oils

Hazards
Flash point	162.4 °C (324.3 °F; 435.5 K)
- Except where otherwise noted, data are given for materials in their standard state (at 25 °C [77 °F], 100 kPa). Infobox references

Mercury(II) stearate is a metal-organic compound, a salt of mercury and stearic acid with the chemical formula Hg(C_{18}H_{35}O_{2})_{2}. The compound is classified as a metallic soap, i.e. a metal derivative of a fatty acid. The compound is highly toxic by inhalation, ingestion, and skin absorption.

== Preparation ==
It is prepared via an exchange reaction of sodium stearate and mercury(II) chloride:

HgCl_{2} + 2 NaC_{18}H_{35}O_{2} → Hg(C_{18}H_{35}O_{2})_{2}↓ + 2 NaCl

It may also be prepared by heating mercury(I) oxide (Hg_{2}O) with stearic acid.

== Uses ==
It is used as a germicide and as a plasticizer in the production of ceramics.
