= Cobalt(II) stearate =

Names
- Other names: Cobaltous stearate; Cobalt distearate; Cobalt dioctadecanoate; Cobalt(2+) octadecanoate

Identifiers
CAS Number	1002-88-6
3D model (JSmol)	Interactive image
ChemSpider	4953647
ECHA InfoCard	100.012.449
EC Number	213-694-7
PubChem CID	6451168
UNII	000J930IO1
CompTox Dashboard (EPA)	4029729
- InChI: InChI=1S/2C18H36O2.Co/c2*1-2-3-4-5-6-7-8-9-10-11-12-13-14-15-16-17-18(19)20;/h2*2-17H2,1H3,(H,19,20);/q;;+2/p-2 Key: AMFIJXSMYBKJQV-UHFFFAOYSA-L
- SMILES: CCCCCCCCCCCCCCCCCC(=O)[O-].CCCCCCCCCCCCCCCCCC(=O)[O-].[Co+2]

Properties
Chemical formula	C_{36}H_{70}CoO_{4}
Molar mass	625.46
Appearance	violet solid
Density	1.7 g/cm^{3}
Melting point	109 °C (228 °F; 382 K)
Boiling point	359.4 °C (678.9 °F; 632.5 K)
Solubility in water	insoluble

Hazards
- GHS labelling
Pictograms	(GHS07: Exclamation mark) (GHS08: Health hazard) (GHS09: Environmental hazard)
Signal word	Danger
Hazard statements	H315, H317, H319, H334, H351, H411
Precautionary statements	P261, P264, P272, P273, P280, P284, P302+P352, P304+P340, P305+P351+P338, P318, P321, P332+P317, P333+P313, P337+P317, P342+P316, P362+P364, P391, P405, P501
Flash point	191 °C (376 °F; 464 K)
- Except where otherwise noted, data are given for materials in their standard state (at 25 °C [77 °F], 100 kPa). Infobox references

Cobalt(II) stearate is a metal-organic compound, a salt of cobalt and stearic acid with the chemical formula C_{36}H_{70}CoO_{4}. The compound is classified as a metallic soap, i.e. a metal derivative of a fatty acid.

== Synthesis ==
Cobalt(II) stearate can be precipitated by reacting sodium stearate and cobalt dichloride:

CoCl_{2} + 2 C_{17}H_{35}COONa → Co(C_{17}H_{35}COO)_{2} + 2 NaCl

== Uses ==
Cobalt(II) stearate is a high-performance bonding agent for rubber. The compound is suitable for applications in natural rubber, cisdene, styrene-butadiene rubber, and their compounds to bond easily with brass- or zinc-plated steel cord or metal plates as well as various bare steel, especially for bonding with brass plating of various thicknesses.
