= Nickel(II) laurate =

Names
- Other names nickel(2+) dodecanoate

Identifiers
CAS Number	13282-11-6
3D model (JSmol)	Interactive image
ChemSpider	62861705
PubChem CID	19046884
- InChI: InChI=1S/2C12H24O2.Ni/c2*1-2-3-4-5-6-7-8-9-10-11-12(13)14;/h2*2-11H2,1H3,(H,13,14);/q;;+2/p-2 Key: JOSJZPLSVYWPAG-UHFFFAOYSA-L
- SMILES: CCCCCCCCCCCC(=O)[O-].CCCCCCCCCCCC(=O)[O-].[Ni+2]

Properties
Chemical formula	C_{24}H_{46}NiO_{4}
Molar mass	457.321 g·mol^{−1}
- Except where otherwise noted, data are given for materials in their standard state (at 25 °C [77 °F], 100 kPa). Infobox references

Nickel(II) laurate is a metal-organic compound with the chemical formula C_{24}H_{46}NiO_{4}. It is classified as a metallic soap, i.e. a metal derivative of a fatty acid (lauric acid).

== Preparation ==
Reaction of acqueos solutions of nickel salt and soluble laurate. Nickel(II) laurate forms green precipitate.
