= Potassium laurate =

Names
- Other names Potassium dodecanoate

Identifiers
| CAS Number | 10124-65-9 incorrect SMILES |
| 3D model (JSmol) | Interactive image |
| ChemSpider | 67701-09-1 |
| ECHA InfoCard | 100.030.300 |
| EC Number | 233-344-7 |
| PubChem CID | 23675775 |
| UNII | V4361R8N4Z |
| CompTox Dashboard (EPA) | DTXSID5027722 |
- InChI: InChI=1S/C12H24O2.K/c1-2-3-4-5-6-7-8-9-10-11-12(13)14;/h2-11H2,1H3,(H,13,14);/q;+1/p-1 Key: HIDKSOTTZRMUML-UHFFFAOYSA-M
- SMILES: CCCCCCCCCCCC(=O)[O-].[K+]

Properties
| Chemical formula | C_{12}H_{23}KO_{2} |
| Molar mass | 238.41 |
| Appearance | Powder or light-tan paste |
| Melting point | 43.8 °C (110.8 °F; 316.9 K) |
| Boiling point | 296.1 °C (565.0 °F; 569.2 K) |
| Solubility in water | Soluble |

Hazards
- GHS labelling
| Signal word | Warning |
- Except where otherwise noted, data are given for materials in their standard state (at 25 °C [77 °F], 100 kPa). Infobox references

Potassium laurate is a metal-organic compound with the chemical formula C_{12}H_{23}KO_{2}. The compound is classified as a metallic soap, i.e. a metal derivative of a fatty acid (lauric acid).

== Synthesis ==
Potassium laurate can be prepared via a reaction of lauric acid and potassium hydroxide.

== Physical properties ==
Soluble in water. Soluble in ethyl benzene.

Forms powder or light-tan paste.

== Uses ==
The compound is used in the cosmetics industry as an emulsifier and surfactant.

Also used as a fungicide, insecticide, and bactericide.
