= Aluminium laurate =

Names
- Other names Aluminum dodecanoate, aluminum trilaurate

Identifiers
CAS Number	7230-93-5
3D model (JSmol)	Interactive image
ChemSpider	11666123
EC Number	230-632-4
PubChem CID	18764696
UNII	EQ065E93JO
CompTox Dashboard (EPA)	DTXSID00993084
- InChI: InChI=1S/3C12H24O2.Al/c3*1-2-3-4-5-6-7-8-9-10-11-12(13)14;/h3*2-11H2,1H3,(H,13,14);/q;;;+3/p-3 Key: KMJRBSYFFVNPPK-UHFFFAOYSA-K
- SMILES: CCCCCCCCCCCC(=O)[O-].CCCCCCCCCCCC(=O)[O-].CCCCCCCCCCCC(=O)[O-].[Al+3]

Properties
Chemical formula	C_{36}H_{69}AlO_{6}
Molar mass	624.9
Appearance	White powder
Boiling point	296 °C (565 °F; 569 K)
Solubility in water	Soluble
- Except where otherwise noted, data are given for materials in their standard state (at 25 °C [77 °F], 100 kPa). Infobox references

Aluminium laurate is a metal-organic compound with the chemical formula C_{36}H_{69}AlO_{6}. The compound is classified as a metallic soap, i.e. a metal derivative of a fatty acid (lauric acid).

== Physical properties ==
Aluminium laurate forms white powder.

Soluble in water.

== Use ==
Aluminium laurate is used as an anticaking agent, free-flow agent, or emulsifier.
