= Excipient =

Non-active ingredient in a medication

An excipient is a substance formulated alongside the active ingredient of a medication. They enhance the active ingredient's therapeutic properties; to facilitate drug absorption, to modify viscosity, to enhance solubility, to improve long-term stabilization (preventing denaturation and aggregation during the expected shelf life). During the manufacturing process, excipients can improve the handling of active substances and facilitate powder flow. The choice of excipients depends on factors such as the intended route of administration, the dosage form, and compatibility with the active ingredient.

Virtually all marketed drugs contain excipients, and final drug formulations commonly contain more excipient than active ingredient. Pharmaceutical regulations and standards mandate the identification and safety assessment of all ingredients in drugs, including their chemical decomposition products.

== Relative versus absolute inactivity ==
Though excipients were at one time assumed to be "inactive" ingredients, it is now understood that they can sometimes be "a key determinant of dosage form performance"; in other words, their effects on pharmacodynamics and pharmacokinetics, although usually negligible, cannot be known to be negligible without empirical confirmation and sometimes are important. For that reason, in basic research and clinical trials they are sometimes included in the control substances in order to minimize confounding, reflecting that otherwise, the absence of the active ingredient would not be the only variable involved, because absence of excipient cannot always be assumed not to be a variable. Such studies are called excipient-controlled or vehicle-controlled studies.

== Types ==
=== Adjuvants ===
Adjuvants are added to vaccines to enhance or modify the immune system response to an immunization. An adjuvant may stimulate the immune system to respond more vigorously to a vaccine, which leads to more robust immunity in the recipient.

=== Antiadherents ===
Antiadherents reduce the adhesion between the powder (granules) and the punch faces and thus prevent sticking to tablet punches by offering a non-stick surface. They are also used to help protect tablets from sticking. The most commonly used is magnesium stearate.

=== Antioxidants ===
Antioxidants extend the shelf life of drugs by slowing the degradation of the active ingredient.

=== Binders ===
Binders hold the ingredients in a tablet together. Binders ensure that tablets and granules can be formed with required mechanical strength, and give volume to low active dose tablets. Binders are usually:

- Saccharides and their derivatives:
  - Disaccharides: sucrose, lactose;
  - Polysaccharides and their derivatives: starches, cellulose or modified cellulose such as microcrystalline cellulose and cellulose ethers such as hydroxypropyl cellulose (HPC);
  - Sugar alcohols such as xylitol, sorbitol or mannitol;
- Protein: gelatin;
- Synthetic polymers: polyvinylpyrrolidone (PVP), polyethylene glycol (PEG)...

Binders are classified according to their application:

- Solution binders are dissolved in a solvent (for example water or alcohol can be used in wet granulation processes). Examples include gelatin, cellulose, cellulose derivatives, polyvinylpyrrolidone, starch, sucrose and polyethylene glycol.
- Dry binders are added to the powder blend, either after a wet granulation step, or as part of a direct powder compression (DC) formula. Examples include cellulose, methyl cellulose, polyvinylpyrrolidone and polyethylene glycol.

=== Bulking agents ===
Also known as fillers and diluents, bulking agents add mass to solid formulations that have small amounts of potent active ingredients.

=== Coatings ===
Tablet coatings protect tablet ingredients from deterioration by moisture in the air and make large or unpleasant-tasting tablets easier to swallow. For most coated tablets, a cellulose ether hydroxypropyl methylcellulose (HPMC) film coating is used which is free of sugar and potential allergens. Occasionally, other coating materials are used, for example synthetic polymers, shellac, corn protein zein or other polysaccharides. Capsules are coated with gelatin.

Enterics control the rate of drug release and determine where the drug will be released in the digestive tract. Materials used for enteric coatings include fatty acids, waxes, shellac, plastics, and plant fibers.

=== Colours ===
Colours are added to improve the appearance of a formulation. Colour consistency is important as it allows easy identification of a medication. Furthermore, colours often improve the aesthetic look and feel of medications. Small amounts of colouring agents are easily processed by the body, although rare reactions are known, notably to tartrazine. Commonly, titanium oxide is used as a colouring agent to produce the popular opaque colours along with azo dyes for other colors. By increasing these organoleptic properties a patient is more likely to adhere to their schedule and therapeutic objectives will also have a better outcome for the patient especially children.

=== Controlled release ===
Polymeric additives are used to control the release rate of the active ingredient.

=== Disintegrants ===
Disintegrants cause the tablet to break apart upon administration. In this way, they release the active ingredients for absorption. They ensure that when the tablet is in contact with water, it rapidly breaks down into smaller fragments, facilitating dissolution. The most common disintegrant is starch. Other disintegrants include crosslinked polymers: crosslinked polyvinylpyrrolidone (crospovidone), crosslinked sodium carboxymethyl cellulose (croscarmellose sodium). sodium starch glycolate, a modified starch is also used.

=== Flavours ===
Flavours can be used to mask unpleasant tasting active ingredients and improve the acceptance that the patient will complete a course of medication. Flavourings may be natural (e.g. fruit extract) or artificial.

For example, to improve:

- a bitter product–mint, cherry or anise may be used
- a salty product–peach, apricot or liquorice may be used
- a sour product–raspberry or liquorice may be used
- an excessively sweet product–vanilla may be used

=== Glidants ===
Glidants are used to promote powder flow by reducing interparticle friction and cohesion. These are used in combination with lubricants as they have no ability to reduce wall friction. Examples include silica gel, fumed silica, talc, and magnesium carbonate. However, some silica gel glidants such as Syloid(R) 244 FP and Syloid(R) XDP are multi-functional and offer several other performance benefits in addition to reducing interparticle friction including moisture resistance, taste, marketing, etc.

=== Lubricants ===
Lubricants prevent ingredients from clumping together and from sticking to the tablet punches or capsule filling machine. Lubricants also ensure that tablet formation and ejection can occur with low friction between the solid and the wall.

Common minerals like talc or silica, and fats, e.g. vegetable stearin, magnesium stearate or stearic acid are the most frequently used lubricants in tablets or hard gelatin capsules. Lubricants are agents added in small quantities to tablet and capsule formulations to improve certain processing characteristics. While lubricants are often added to improve manufacturability of the drug products, it may also negatively impact the product quality. For example, extended mixing of lubricants during blending may results in delayed dissolution and softer tablets, which is often referred to as "over-lubrication". Therefore, optimizing lubrication time is critical during pharmaceutical development.

There are three roles identified with lubricants as follows:

- True lubricant role:

To decrease friction at the interface between a tablet’s surface and the die wall during ejection and reduce wear on punches and dies.

- Anti-adherent role:

Prevent sticking to punch faces or in the case of encapsulation, lubricants.
Prevent sticking to machine dosators, tamping pins, etc.

- Glidant role:

Enhance product flow by reducing interparticulate friction.

There are two major types of lubricants:

- Hydrophilic

Generally poor lubricants, no glidant or anti-adherent properties.

- Hydrophobic

Most widely used lubricants in use today are of the hydrophobic category. Hydrophobic lubricants are generally good lubricants and are usually effective at relatively low concentrations. Many also have both anti-adherent and glidant properties. For these reasons, hydrophobic lubricants are used much more frequently than hydrophilic compounds. Examples include magnesium stearate.

=== Preservatives ===
Some typical preservatives used in pharmaceutical formulations are

- Antioxidants like vitamin A, vitamin E, vitamin C, retinyl palmitate, and selenium
- The amino acids cysteine and methionine
- Citric acid and sodium citrate
- Synthetic preservatives like the parabens: methyl paraben and propyl paraben.

=== Sorbents ===
Sorbents are used for tablet/capsule moisture-proofing by limited fluid sorbing (taking up of a liquid or a gas either by adsorption or by absorption) in a dry state. For example, desiccants absorb water, drying out (desiccating) the surrounding materials.

=== Sweeteners ===
Sweeteners are added to make the ingredients more palatable, especially in chewable tablets such as antacid or liquids like cough syrup. Sugar can be used to mask unpleasant tastes or smells, but artificial sweeteners tend to be preferred, as natural ones tend to cause tooth decay.

=== Vehicles ===
In liquid and gel formulations, the bulk excipient that serves as a medium for conveying the active ingredient is usually called the vehicle. Petrolatum, dimethyl sulfoxide and mineral oil are common vehicles.

== See also ==
- Active ingredient
- Pharmaceutics
- Pharmacology
- Placebo
- Placebo effect
- Quality system
