= Glycol distearate =

Names
- Preferred IUPAC name Ethane-1,2-diyl di(octadecanoate)
- Other names Ethylene glycol distearate; Ethylene distearate; Ethylene glycol dioctadecanoate

Identifiers
CAS Number	627-83-8
3D model (JSmol)	Interactive image
ChemSpider	55120
ECHA InfoCard	100.010.014
PubChem CID	61174
UNII	13W7MDN21W
CompTox Dashboard (EPA)	DTXSID40890487 DTXSID6027260, DTXSID40890487
- InChI: InChI=1S/C38H74O4/c1-3-5-7-9-11-13-15-17-19-21-23-25-27-29-31-33-37(39)41-35-36-42-38(40)34-32-30-28-26-24-22-20-18-16-14-12-10-8-6-4-2/h3-36H2,1-2H3 Key: FPVVYTCTZKCSOJ-UHFFFAOYSA-N
- SMILES: O=C(OCCOC(=O)CCCCCCCCCCCCCCCCC)CCCCCCCCCCCCCCCCC

Properties
Chemical formula	C_{38}H_{74}O_{4}
Molar mass	595.006 g·mol^{−1}
Appearance	White Flake
Melting point	65 to 73 °C (149 to 163 °F; 338 to 346 K)
Solubility in water	Insoluble

Hazards
- Lethal dose or concentration (LD, LC)
LD_{50} (median dose)	4,700 mg/kg (rat)
- Except where otherwise noted, data are given for materials in their standard state (at 25 °C [77 °F], 100 kPa). Infobox references

Glycol distearate is the diester of stearic acid and ethylene glycol. It is mostly commonly encountered in personal care products and cosmetics where it is used to produce pearlescent effects as well as a moisturizer.

== Synthesis ==
Glycol distearate may be produced via the esterification of stearic acid (or its esters) with ethylene glycol. It can also be produced by a reaction of stearic acid with ethylene oxide.

== Applications ==
When forced to crystallize as thin platelets glycol distearate can give liquids and gels a pearlescent appearance. This is often used by the producers of personal care products (e.g. shower gel) to increase the visual appeal of their products. It may also act as a skin moisturizer.

Glycol distearate is also commonly used as an embedding agent in microscopy.

== See also ==
- Glycol stearate
- Ethylene bis(stearamide)
