= C15H12N2O3 =

The molecular formula C_{15}H_{12}N_{2}O_{3} (molar mass: 268.27 g/mol, exact mass: 268.0848 g/mol) may refer to:

- Disperse Red 11
- Hydrofuramide
