= Potassium stearate =

Names
- Other names Potassium octadecanoate

Identifiers
CAS Number	593-29-3
3D model (JSmol)	Interactive image
ChemSpider	11143
ECHA InfoCard	100.008.898
EC Number	209-786-1
PubChem CID	23673840
UNII	17V812XK50
CompTox Dashboard (EPA)	0042323
- InChI: InChI=1S/C18H36O2.K/c1-2-3-4-5-6-7-8-9-10-11-12-13-14-15-16-17-18(19)20;/h2-17H2,1H3,(H,19,20);/q;+1/p-1 Key: ANBFRLKBEIFNQU-UHFFFAOYSA-M
- SMILES: CCCCCCCCCCCCCCCCCC(=O)[O-].[K+]

Properties
Chemical formula	C_{18}H_{35}KO_{2}
Molar mass	322.574 g·mol^{−1}
Appearance	colorless crystals
Density	1.12 g/cm^{3}
Boiling point	359.4 °C (678.9 °F; 632.5 K)
Solubility in water	soluble in hot water

Hazards
- GHS labelling
Pictograms	(GHS07: Exclamation mark) (GHS09: Environmental hazard)
Signal word	Warning
- Except where otherwise noted, data are given for materials in their standard state (at 25 °C [77 °F], 100 kPa). Infobox references

Potassium stearate is a metal-organic compound, a salt of potassium and stearic acid with the chemical formula C_{18}H_{35}KO_{2}. The compound is classified as a metallic soap, which is a metal derivative of a fatty acid.

== Synthesis ==
Potassium stearate can prepared by saturating a hot alcoholic solution of stearic acid with alcoholic potash.

== Physical properties ==
The compound forms colorless crystals.

Slightly soluble in cold water, soluble in hot water, ethanol, insoluble in ether, chloroform, carbon disulfide. A component of liquid soap.

== Uses ==
The compound is primarily used as an emulsifier in cosmetics and in food products. It is also used as a cleansing ingredient and lubricant.

== Hazards ==
Causes skin irritation and serious eye irritation.
