= Rubber pollution =

Pollution due to rubber dust particles

Rubber Pollution
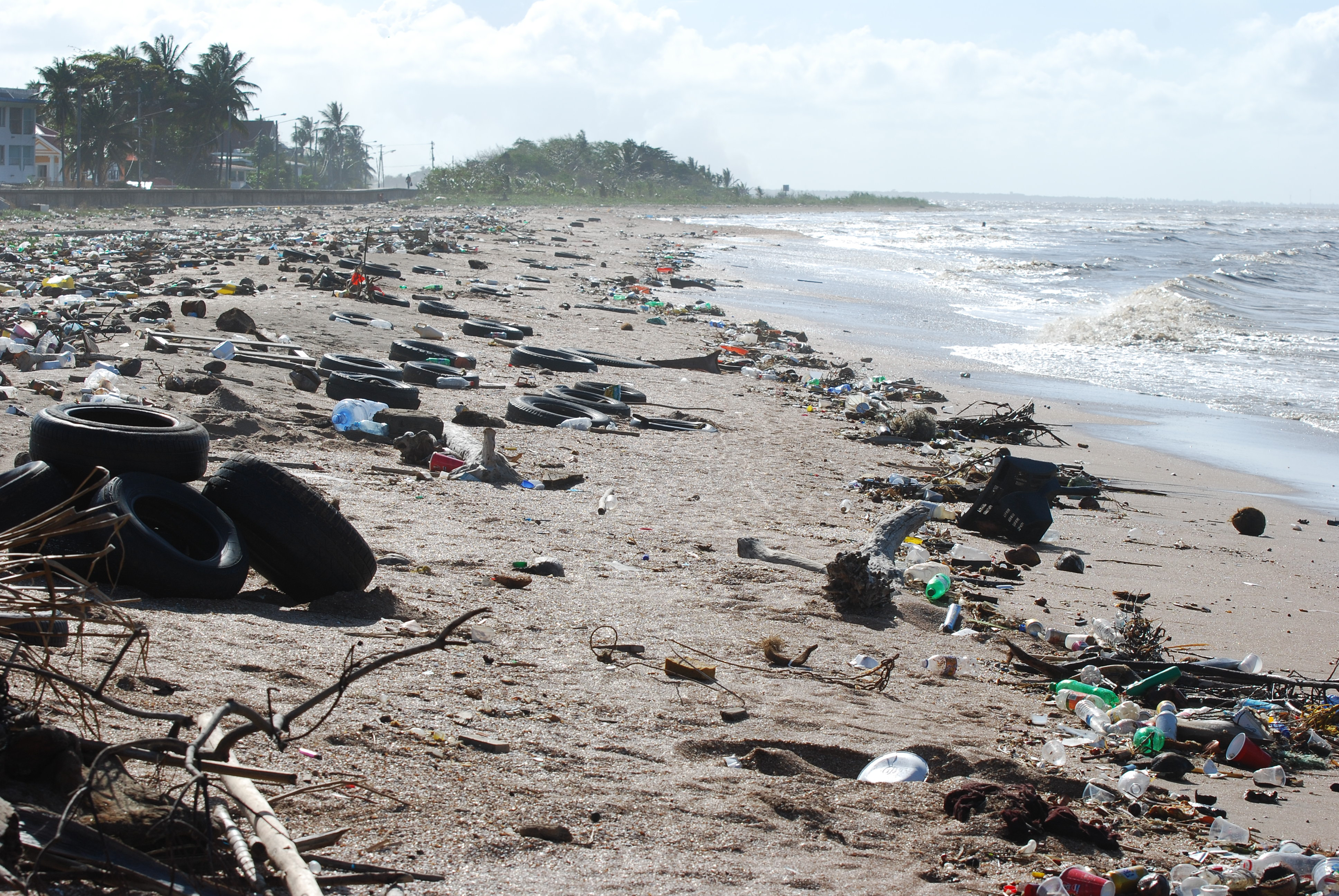
- Location: Global
- Cause: Improper disposal of rubber products Wear and tear, abrasion of rubber products
- Participants: Various environmental organizations

Rubber pollution, similar to plastic pollution, occurs in various environments, and originates from a variety of sources, ranging from the food industry processing chain to tire wear. Synthetic and natural rubber dust and fragments now occur in food, airborne as particulates in air pollution, hidden in the earth as soil pollution, and in waterways, lakes and the sea.

== Causes ==
=== Tyre and road wear particles (TRWP) ===
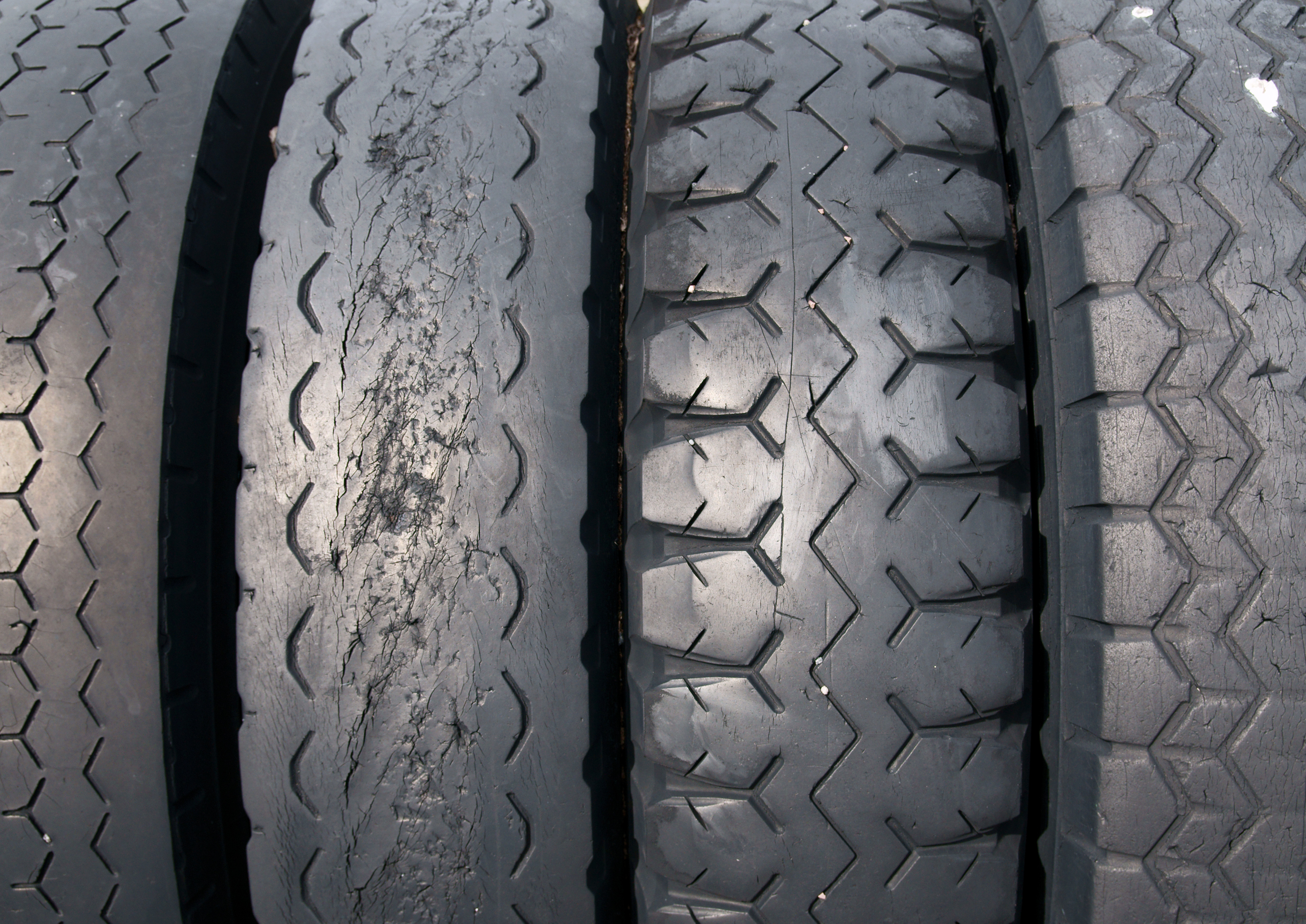
A view of an old car tyre surface

Vehicle tire wear is a major source of rubber pollution, other sources can be from artificial turf(usually made from shredded old tires) and rubber O-rings and seals. Tyre and road wear particles (TRWP) or tire wear particles (TWP) are a direct result of the road surface abrasion during vehicle transit and are thought to be released into the environment at a rate of 6 million tons year, with the United States and the European Union emitting roughly 1120,000 and 1327,000 tons annually. In Switzerland, they are estimated to be responsible for 90% of the microplastics released into the environment. Road water treatment systems recover around a quarter of this amount, with the rest ending up in the environment.

Both brand and season application affect the tire composition but rubber is usually the main component besides several additives such as, oils, fillers, vulcanisation chemicals and other chemicals added to increase performance. A concern is that, unlike exhaust emissions, tire wear pollution is not regulated, despite several studies documenting their potential toxicity. Some devices are nonetheless being developed in an effort to reduce the amount of particulates expelled from tire wear and otherwise ending up in the environment. Although not immediately visible to the naked eye, tire dust makes up a significant portion of road debris.

It is believed that between 10 and 18 percent of the TWP released each year enter aquatic environments and can even be found in remote locations due to atmospheric transportation. However, it has been found that sediments are sinks for TWP and that the surface water concentration of these particles is much lower. Understanding the effect of these particles is challenging as the chemical leaching rate from TWP depends on environmental factors such as temperature, pH, and salinity, as well as the particle size and composition of TWP.

== Classification ==
Very fine rubber dust particles can, depending on the classification be counted as microplastic (because rubber is just another polymer) or separately, as fine rubber because its constituent monomers, the required additives, and the type of chemical bond mesh is slightly different. In a similar vein, rubber pollution is often implicitly mentioned when plastic pollution is addressed.

6PPD-quinone, an antiozonant used in rubber tires, has been found to kill endangered Coho Salmon when it accumulates into waterways from tire wear pollution.

== See also ==
- Carbonyl sulfide
- Hydrofuramide
- Tire recycling
