= White carbon =

- Chaoite, an allotrophe of carbon
- Precipitated silica, not carbon, also called 'white carbon black'
