= Magnesium stearate =

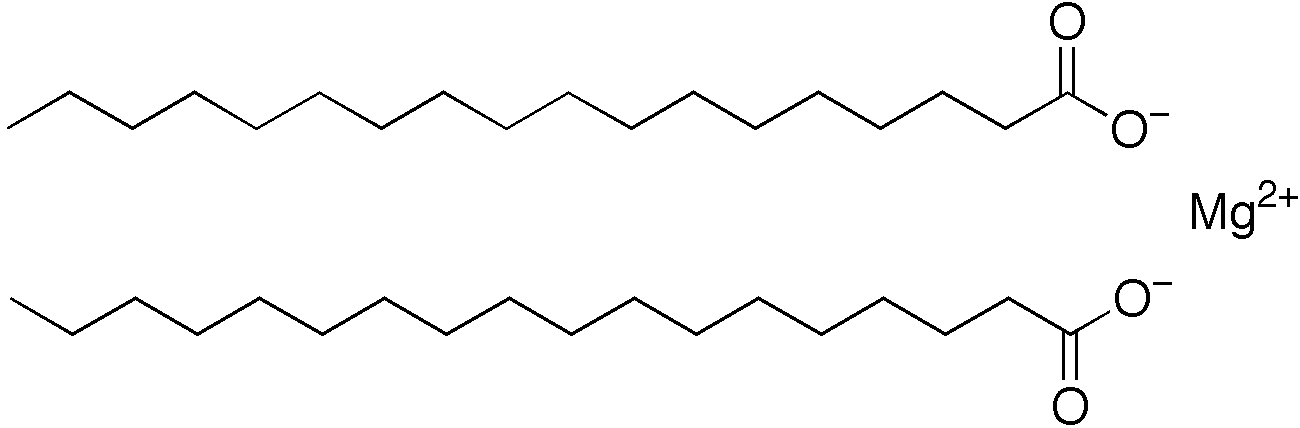

Names
- IUPAC name Magnesium octadecanoate

Identifiers
CAS Number	557-04-0
3D model (JSmol)	Interactive image
ChEBI	CHEBI:9254
ChemSpider	10704 {CH}
ECHA InfoCard	100.008.320
E number	E572 (acidity regulators, ...)
PubChem CID	11177
UNII	70097M6I30
CompTox Dashboard (EPA)	DTXSID2027208
- InChI: InChI=1S/2C18H36O2.Mg/c2*1-2-3-4-5-6-7-8-9-10-11-12-13-14-15-16-17-18(19)20;/h2*2-17H2,1H3,(H,19,20);/q;;+2/p-2 Key: HQKMJHAJHXVSDF-UHFFFAOYSA-L; InChI=1/2C18H36O2.Mg/c2*1-2-3-4-5-6-7-8-9-10-11-12-13-14-15-16-17-18(19)20;/h2*2-17H2,1H3,(H,19,20);/q;;+2/p-2 Key: HQKMJHAJHXVSDF-NUQVWONBAM
- SMILES: [Mg+2].[O-]C(=O)CCCCCCCCCCCCCCCCC.[O-]C(=O)CCCCCCCCCCCCCCCCC

Properties
Chemical formula	Mg(C_{18}H_{35}O_{2})_{2}
Molar mass	591.257 g·mol^{−1}
Appearance	light white powder
Odor	slight
Density	1.026 g/cm^{3}
Melting point	88.5 °C (191.3 °F; 361.6 K)
Solubility in water	0.003 g/100 mL (15 °C); 0.004 g/100 mL (25 °C); 0.008 g/100 mL (50 °C)
Solubility	negligible in ether and alcohol slightly soluble in benzene

Hazards
NFPA 704 (fire diamond)	1 1 0
Flash point	250 °C (482 °F; 523 K)
- Lethal dose or concentration (LD, LC)
LD_{50} (median dose)	> 1000 mg/kg (oral, rat)
Safety data sheet (SDS)	External MSDS
- Except where otherwise noted, data are given for materials in their standard state (at 25 °C [77 °F], 100 kPa). verify (what is ?) Infobox references

Magnesium stearate is a metal-organic compound, a salt of magnesium and stearic acid with the idealized chemical formula (C_{17}H_{35}CO_{2})_{2}Mg. It is classified as a metallic soap, i.e. a metal derivative of a fatty acid. Magnesium stearate is a white, water-insoluble powder. Its applications exploit its softness, insolubility in many solvents, and low toxicity. It is used as a release agent and as a component or lubricant in the production of pharmaceuticals and cosmetics.

== Speciation ==
Anhydrous magnesium stearate is known, with the formula (C_{17}H_{35}CO_{2})_{2}Mg. More important are the hydrates, which have the formula (C_{17}H_{35}CO_{2})_{2}Mg(H_{2}O)_{n} where n = 1, 2, 3. The latter has been characterized by X-ray crystallography.

== Manufacturing ==
Magnesium stearate is produced by the reaction of sodium stearate with magnesium salts or by treating magnesium oxide with stearic acid.

== Uses ==
Magnesium stearate is the most widely used additive in pharmaceuticals. It is also used in food preparations as an anti-adherent and anticaking agent. in the manufacture of medical tablets, capsules and powders. In this regard, the substance is also useful because it has lubricating properties, preventing ingredients from sticking to manufacturing equipment during the compression of chemical powders into solid tablets; magnesium stearate is the most commonly used lubricant for tablets. However, it might cause lower wettability and slower disintegration of the tablets and slower and even lower dissolution of the drug.

Magnesium stearate can also be used efficiently in dry coating processes.

In the production of pressed candies, magnesium stearate serves as a release agent. It is also used to bind sugar in hard candies such as mints.

In the EU and EFTA, it is listed as food additive E470b.

== Occurrence ==
When produced by soap and hard water, magnesium stearate and calcium stearate both form a white solid insoluble in water, and are collectively known as soap scum. This scum is a major component of the common "ring" of scum around a drained bathtub.

== Safety ==
Magnesium stearate is generally considered safe for human consumption at levels below 2500 mg per kg of body weight per day and is classified in the United States as generally recognized as safe (GRAS). In 1979, the FDA's Subcommittee on GRAS Substances (SCOGS) reported, "There is no evidence in the available information on ... magnesium stearate ... that demonstrates, or suggests reasonable grounds to suspect, a hazard to the public when they are used at levels that are now current and in the manner now practiced, or which might reasonably be expected in the future."
