= Tris(2-ethylhexyl) phosphate =

Identifiers
CAS Number	78-42-2
3D model (JSmol)	Interactive image
Abbreviations	TEHP
ChEBI	CHEBI:181994
ChEMBL	ChEMBL1562290
ChemSpider	6289
ECHA InfoCard	100.001.015
EC Number	201-116-6
PubChem CID	6537
RTECS number	MP0770000
UNII	BQC0BKB72S
CompTox Dashboard (EPA)	DTXSID0021414
- InChI: InChI=1S/C24H51O4P/c1-7-13-16-22(10-4)19-26-29(25,27-20-23(11-5)17-14-8-2)28-21-24(12-6)18-15-9-3/h22-24H,7-21H2,1-6H3 Key: GTVWRXDRKAHEAD-UHFFFAOYSA-N
- SMILES: CCCCC(CC)COP(=O)(OCC(CC)CCCC)OCC(CC)CCCC

Properties
Chemical formula	C_{24}H_{51}O_{4}P
Molar mass	434.642 g·mol^{−1}

Hazards
- GHS labelling:.
Pictograms	(GHS07: Exclamation mark)
Signal word	Warning
Hazard statements	H315, H319, H335
Precautionary statements	P261, P264, P264+P265, P271, P280, P302+P352, P304+P340, P305+P351+P338, P319, P321, P332+P317, P337+P317, P362+P364, P403+P233, P405, P501
- Except where otherwise noted, data are given for materials in their standard state (at 25 °C [77 °F], 100 kPa). Infobox references

Tris(2-ethylhexyl)phosphate (TEHP) is an organic chemical compound in the organophosphate group. It is a triakylphosphate.

== Occurrence ==
Since tris(2-ethylhexyl) phosphate is easily separated from polymers if present as a plasticizer, it is often found in house dust

== Properties ==
Tris(2-ethylhexyl) phosphate is a colourless, viscous liquid with a faint, piercing smell. It has a viscosity of 15 mPas at 20 °C.

== Uses ==
Due to its properties (including that it is a mild biocide), tris(2-ethylhexyl)phosphate is used in a variety of applications:

- as a plasticizer in polymers (PVC, PU, NBR and others) giving good cold flexibility and flame retarding properties
- as a carrier for pigments and dyes used in colouring polymers
- as a component in cutting fluid
- as a component in release agents, used in the metal casting industry
- as a solvent in hydrogen peroxide synthesis

== Safety ==
When heated above its flash point of 170 °C, TEHP can release vapours capable of forming explosive mixtures with air.

TEHP has a particularly high bioaccumulation factor amongst organophosphate flame retardants.
