= Aluminium monostearate =

Names
- IUPAC name Dihydroxy(stearoyloxy)aluminium
- Other names Aluminum monostearate; Dibasic aluminum stearate; Dihydroxyaluminum stearate; Dihydroxy(octadecanoato-O-)aluminium; Dihydroxy(stearato)aluminium

Identifiers
CAS Number	7047-84-9
3D model (JSmol)	Interactive image
ChEBI	CHEBI:31197
ChEMBL	ChEMBL3185220
ChemSpider	11983
DrugBank	DB01375
ECHA InfoCard	100.027.568
EC Number	230-325-5
KEGG	D01867
PubChem CID	16682987
UNII	P9BC99461E
CompTox Dashboard (EPA)	DTXSID9048697
- InChI: InChI=1S/3C18H36O2.Al/c3*1-2-3-4-5-6-7-8-9-10-11-12-13-14-15-16-17-18(19)20;/h3*2-17H2,1H3,(H,19,20);/q;;;+3/p-3 Key: CEGOLXSVJUTHNZ-UHFFFAOYSA-K; InChI=1S/3C18H36O2.Al/c3*1-2-3-4-5-6-7-8-9-10-11-12-13-14-15-16-17-18(19)20;/h3*2-17H2,1H3,(H,19,20);/q;;;+3/p-3; Key: CEGOLXSVJUTHNZ-UHFFFAOYSA-K
- SMILES: CCCCCCCCCCCCCCCCCC(O[Al](O)O)=O

Properties
Chemical formula	C_{18}H_{37}AlO_{4}
Molar mass	344.472 g·mol^{−1}
- Except where otherwise noted, data are given for materials in their standard state (at 25 °C [77 °F], 100 kPa). verify (what is ?) Infobox references

Aluminium monostearate is an organic compound which is a salt of stearic acid and aluminium. It has the molecular formula Al(OH)_{2}C_{18}H_{35}O_{2}. It is also referred to as dihydroxy(octadecanoato-O-)aluminium or dihydroxy(stearato)aluminium.

== Uses ==
It is used to form gels in the packaging of pharmaceuticals, and in the preparation of colors for cosmetics. It is usually safe in commercial products, but aluminium may accumulate in the body.
