= Precipitated silica =

Amorphous form of silica

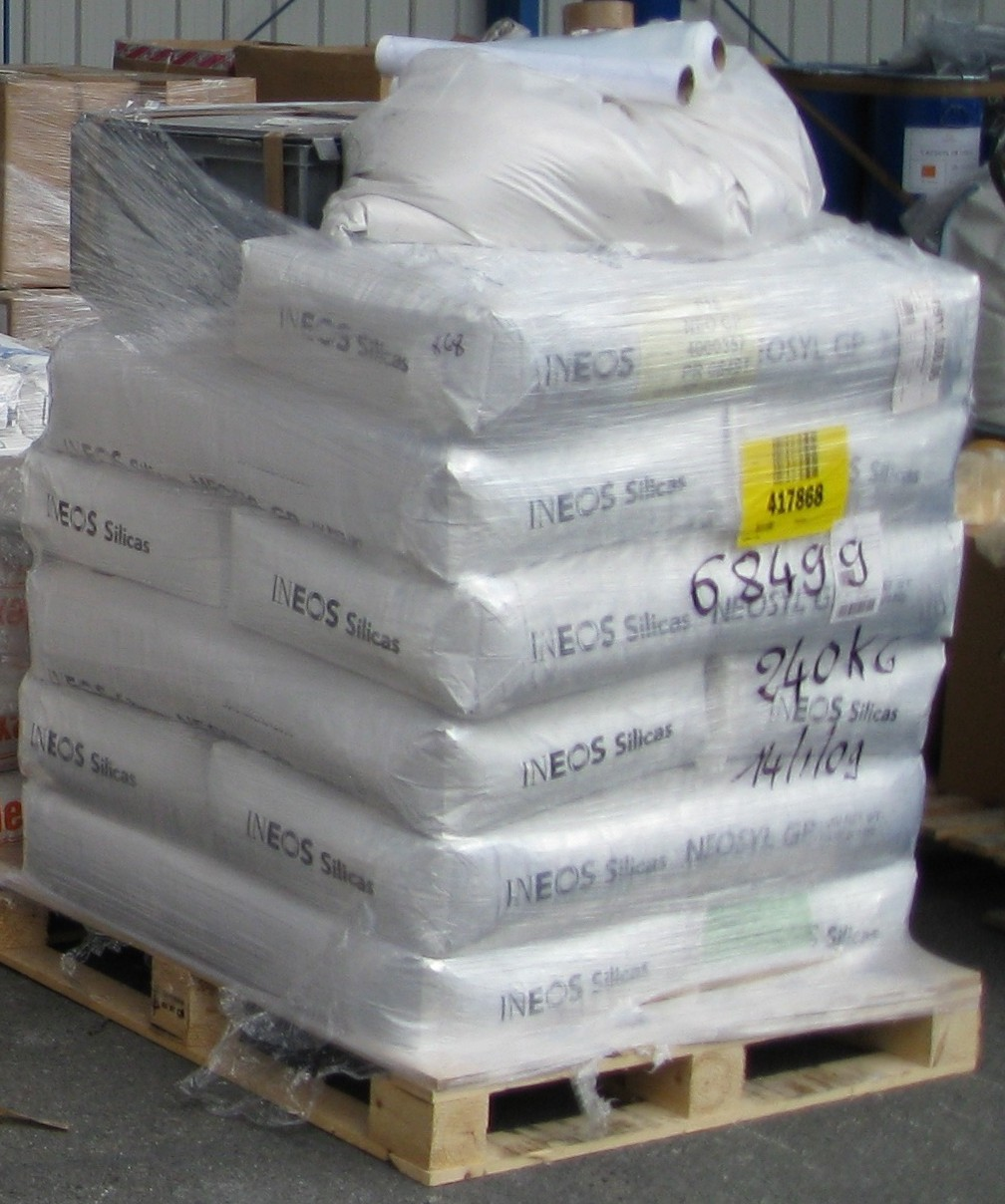
A pallet of precipitated amorphous silica paper bags used as reinforcing filler in formulation.

Precipitated silica is an amorphous form of silica (silicon dioxide, SiO_{2}). It is a white, powdery material produced by precipitation from a solution containing silicate salts.

The three main classes of amorphous silica are pyrogenic silica, precipitated silica and silica gel. Among them, precipitated silica has the greatest commercial significance. In 1999, more than one million tons were produced, half of it is used in tires and shoe soles.

Like pyrogenic silica, precipitated silica is essentially not microporous (unless prepared by the Stöber process).

== Production ==
The production of precipitated silica starts with the reaction of a basic silicate solution with a mineral acid. Sulfuric acid and sodium silicate solutions are added simultaneously with agitation to water. Precipitation is carried out under acidic or basic conditions. The choice of agitation, duration of precipitation, the addition rate of reactants, their temperature and concentration and pH can vary the properties of the resulting silica. The formation of a gel stage is avoided by stirring at elevated temperatures. The resulting white precipitate is filtered, washed and dried in the manufacturing process in order to wash out the produced salts.

Na_{2}(SiO_{2})_{7} + H_{2}SO_{4} + O → 7 SiO_{2} + Na_{2}SO_{4} + H_{2}O
Na_{2}SiO_{3} + H_{2}SO_{4} → SiO_{2} + Na_{2}SO_{4} + H_{2}O

== Properties ==
The particles are porous. Primary structures typically have a diameter of 5 - 100 nm, and specific surface area 5–100 m^{2}/g. Agglomerate size is 1 - 40 μm with average pore size is > 30 nm. Density: 1.9 - 2.1 g/cm^{3}.

== Applications ==
- Filler, softener and performance improvement in rubber and plastics
- Cleaning, thickening and polishing agent in toothpastes for oral health care
- Food processing and pharmaceuticals additive as anti-caking, thickening agent, absorbent to make liquids into powders.
- Food rheology modifier
- Defoamer

== See related companies ==
- Fujian Sanming Zheng Yuan Chemical Co., Ltd.
- Anten Chemical Co., Ltd.
- PPG Industries Co.
- Evonik Industries AG
- Pak Chromical Ltd., (PCL)

== See also ==
- Colloidal silica
- Fumed silica
- Hydrophobic silica
- Silica gel
