= Hydrophobic silica =

SiO2 surface modified by chemically bonded hydrophobic groups

Hydrophobic silica is a form of silicon dioxide (commonly known as silica) that has hydrophobic groups chemically bonded to the surface. The hydrophobic groups are normally alkyl or polydimethylsiloxane chains. Hydrophobic silica can be processed in different ways; such as fumed silica, precipitated silica, and aerosol assisted self assembly, all existing in the form of nanoparticles.

== Structure ==
Hydrophobic silica has an orthorhombic crystal structure (its space group name is Pmna under the bipyramidal point group). Orthorhombic structures are the product of stretching a cubic lattice along two of its orthogonal pairs, resulting in a rectangular prism shaped crystal structure.

Orthorhombic Bravais lattices
| simple | base-centered | body-centered | face-centered |
| Orthohombic, simple | Orthohombic, base-centered | Orthohombic, body-centered | Orthohombic, face-centered |

== Properties ==
Hydrophobic silica displays water resistant properties because of its nanostructure and chemical properties. When applied to a surface of a material, the nanoparticles adhere to the host material and prevent liquids from permeating the rough texture. The water only comes into contact with the tips of the nanoparticles coating the outside of the material. Due to lack of attraction, the water is repelled from the hydrophobic silica.

== Processing ==
Initially, silica is hydrophilic due to the presence of the silanol (Si-OH) groups on the surface of the particle. These silanol groups can chemically react with various reagents to render the silica hydrophobic. There are many different methods of processing silica to become hydrophobic, mainly by adding hydrocarbon groups.

=== Hydrophobic fumed silica ===
Fumed silica can react with chlorosilanes in a fluidized bed reactor at 400 °C

=== Hydrophobic precipitated silica ===
Precipitated silica can be hydrophobized with e.g. alkylchlorosilanes or trimethylsilanol in the precipitated solution. The hydrophobised silica is filtered, washed, dried, and tempered to 300–400 °C to finish the reaction.

=== Hydrophobic plasma polymer coated silica ===
Silica particles can become hydrophobic through plasma polymerization. In this process, plasma polymerized 1,7-octadiene (ppOD) (related to the diene hydrocarbons) is used to deposit polymer films onto the silica particles. The ppOD films are deposited through the use of radio frequencies, along with a reactor containing a rotating chamber. Using low specific energy plasma conditions, the ppOD films chemically render the silica particles hydrophobic.

By using the ppOD films, the hydrophilic polar Si-OH groups in the polymer itself are concealed by non-polar C_{x}H_{y} hydrocarbon groups, so when it's applied as a film to the silica particles, they become hydrophobic as well.

=== Aerosol assisted self-assembly ===
The goal of this process is to quickly and continuously create nanostructured particles deriving from a colloid precursor containing a solvent and silica particles. Aerosol assisted self assembly is a one step process with a high production rate. The process takes a few seconds in terms of reaction time, and there's no requirement for heating and chemically treating the particles after development.

The first part of the process is to create the colloid precursor which consists of the silica nanoparticles and the solvent. The initial silica nanoparticles are in an amorphous crystalline phase and the solvent is composed of trimethylsilyl chloride (TMCS) and ethyl alcohol. To synthesize hydrophobic nanostructured silica using this method, the colloid precursor containing the solvent and silica particles is sprayed by an aerosol generator. The droplets are then transported by a carrier gas to a furnace where they are heated. Upon entry into the furnace, the ethyl alcohol evaporates from the colloid precursor, allowing self-assembly to occur between the silica particles and the surface treating agent, TMCS.

The results of this process causes the silica particles to group together to combine into spherical nanostructured particles. By grouping these silica nanoparticles into a nanostructured particle, a certain percentage of porosity develops within the nanostructure related to the amount of TMCS concentration. Increasing the amount of TMCS concentration reduces the specific surface area of the silica nanostructured particles. The exhibited hydrophobicity is a result of the chemical reaction occurring between the silica particles and the TMCS. When the original SiO_{2}-OH groups are replaced with hydrolytically stable Si(CH_{3}) groups, this hydrophobicity occurs due to the prevention of the silica particles from interacting with water.

== Applications ==
Hydrophobic silica is used to solve technical problems in a number of products including, but not limited to, paints, inks, adhesives, plastics, coatings, toners, defoamers, silicone rubber, sealants, cosmetics, food additives, polyester resins, cable gels, and greases. It's often manufactured as both single and multiphase composites in order to enhance properties such as dispersion, stability behavior, resistance to water, and functionality. Hydrophobic silica has been added to aerogels to increase their ability to adsorb organic pollutants without disrupting the network structure.

=== Treated aggregated fumed silica ===
Hydrophobic silica can be used to treat other surfaces to become hydrophobic, this is due to the morphology of the silica particles once they adhere to their host. The silica particles then alter the surface of its host material resulting in a hydrophobic surface.

Aggregated fumed silica can be applied to large surfaces to render them hydrophobic. Micro and nanoscale structures, resembling ball and block like forms, are attributed to the hydrophobic characteristics. Due to the change in the original surface's texture, the roughness of the surface causes its hydrophobicity to increase. This is because when water comes into contact with the rough surface, it only touches the tips of the rough texture and doesn't permeate any deeper through the rest of the air occupied structure. The water can't spread through the surface, thus yielding hydrophobic properties.

=== Additional applications ===
- Consumer goods
- Rheology control
- Suspension and stability behavior
- Mechanical/optical properties modification
