= 1,7-Octadiene =

Names
- Preferred IUPAC name Octa-1,7-diene

Identifiers
CAS Number	3710-30-3
3D model (JSmol)	Interactive image
ChEBI	CHEBI:183652
ChemSpider	18338
ECHA InfoCard	100.020.959
EC Number	223-054-9
PubChem CID	19460
RTECS number	RG5250000
UNII	N4H29T34J2
UN number	2309
CompTox Dashboard (EPA)	DTXSID6063147
- InChI: InChI=1S/C8H14/c1-3-5-7-8-6-4-2/h3-4H,1-2,5-8H2 Key: XWJBRBSPAODJER-UHFFFAOYSA-N
- SMILES: C=CCCCCC=C

Properties
Chemical formula	C_{8}H_{14}
Molar mass	110.200 g·mol^{−1}
Appearance	Colorless liquid
Density	0.746 g/mL at 25 °C
Boiling point	114–121 °C (237–250 °F; 387–394 K)

Hazards
- GHS labelling
Pictograms	(GHS02: Flammable) (GHS08: Health hazard) (GHS09: Environmental hazard)
Signal word	Danger
Hazard statements	H225, H304, H410, H412
Precautionary statements	P210, P233, P240, P241, P242, P243, P280, P303+P361+P353, P370+P378, P403+P235, P501

Related compounds
Related alkenes and dienes	Isoprene; Chloroprene
Related compounds	Butane
- Except where otherwise noted, data are given for materials in their standard state (at 25 °C [77 °F], 100 kPa). Infobox references

1,7-Octadiene is an organic compound with the condensed formula (CH_{2}=CHCH_{2}CH_{2})_{2}. It is a colorless liquid that serves as a precursor to specialty polymers. It arises commercially by the dimerization of butadiene in the presence of hydrogen. Some of the 1,6-octadiene is also formed. 1,7-Octadiene can be converted to the diol by hydroformylation followed by hydrogenation of the dialdehyde. In a related process, 1,7-octadiene undergoes hydrocyanation to give dinitrile, which can be hydrogenated to give 1,10-diaminodecane.

Conversion of butadiene to 1,10-difunctionalized decanes

== Dimethyloctadienes ==
Structurally related octadienes bearing two methyl groups are of commercial interest. Such compounds are produced by pyrolysis of pinane, which is abundantly available from terpentine or related wood-derived chemicals.

Formation of dimethyloctadienes

== Research ==
The diene has also been the subject of many research papers. For example, with ethylene it undergoes a cross-enyne metathesis Diels–Alder reaction. It undergoes ring-closing metathesis to give cyclooctene. Plasma polymerized 1,7-octadiene films deposited on silica can produce particles with tuned hydrophobicity.
