= OCI (company) =

South Korean chemical company

OCI Company Ltd.
- Native name: 오씨아이 주식회사
- Formerly: DC Chemical
- Type: Public
- Traded as: KRX: 010060
- Industry: Chemical
- Founded: 5 August 1959; 67 years ago
- Founder: Lee Hoi-rim
- Headquarters: Seoul, South Korea
- Key people: Kim Teak-joung (President & CEO)
- Website: www.oci.co.kr/en/

OCI Company Ltd. (OCI; Korean: 오씨아이 주식회사) is a chemical company founded in 1959, with its head office in Seoul, South Korea. The company's name is an initialism of its former corporate name, Oriental Chemical Industries (Korean: 동양화학공업; Hanja: 東洋化學工業; RR: Dongyang Hwahak Gongeop).

The main products of OCI include polycrystalline silicon, hydrogen peroxide, fumed silica, coal tar pitch, BTX, and other chemical related materials.

== History ==
OCI was founded by Lee Hoi-rim as Oriental Chemical Industries in 1959. OCI was the first company to establish a soda ash factory and boosted the alkali industry in South Korea. In 2001, Oriental Chemical Industries merged with Korea Steel Chemical and changed its name to DC Chemical. However, after eight years, DC Chemical was reverted to OCI with the acronym of its original name. The new name, OCI, was given a new meaning as "The Origin of Chemical Innovation," replacing its original expansion, "Oriental Chemical Industries."
