= Zinc stearate =

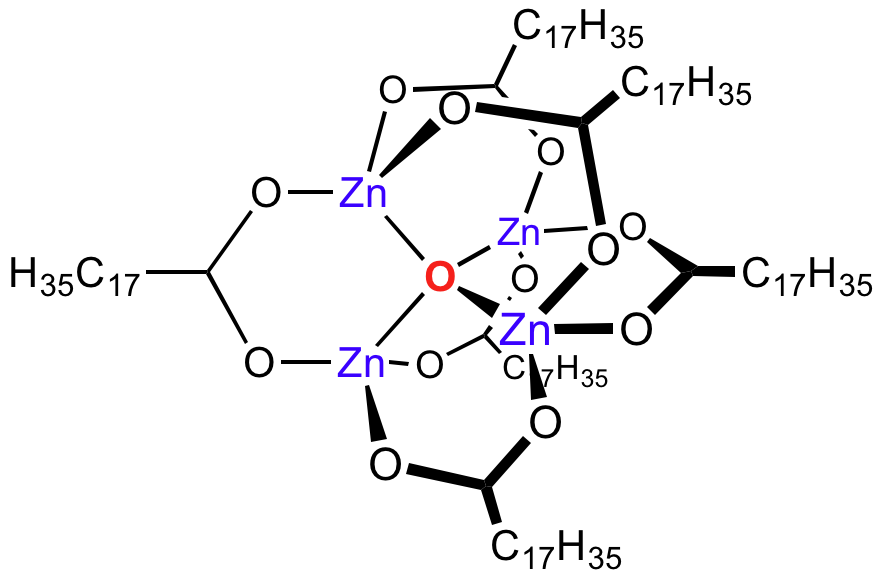
- basic zinc stearate

- Zinc distearate

Names
- IUPAC name zinc octadecanoate
- Other names zinc distearate

Identifiers
CAS Number	557-05-1 Zn_{4}(stearate)_{6}; 57-11-4 Zn(stearate)_{2}
3D model (JSmol)	Interactive image
ChemSpider	10705
ECHA InfoCard	100.008.321
EC Number	209-151-9
PubChem CID	11178
RTECS number	ZH5200000
UNII	H92E6QA4FV
UN number	3077
CompTox Dashboard (EPA)	DTXSID7027209
- InChI: InChI=1S/2C18H36O2.Zn/c2*1-2-3-4-5-6-7-8-9-10-11-12-13-14-15-16-17-18(19)20;/h2*2-17H2,1H3,(H,19,20);/q;;+2/p-2 Key: XOOUIPVCVHRTMJ-UHFFFAOYSA-L; InChI=1/2C18H36O2.Zn/c2*1-2-3-4-5-6-7-8-9-10-11-12-13-14-15-16-17-18(19)20;/h2*2-17H2,1H3,(H,19,20);/q;;+2/p-2 Key: XOOUIPVCVHRTMJ-NUQVWONBAX
- SMILES: [Zn+2].[O-]C(=O)CCCCCCCCCCCCCCCCC.[O-]C(=O)CCCCCCCCCCCCCCCCC

Properties
Chemical formula	C_{36}H_{70}O_{4}Zn
Molar mass	632.33 g·mol^{−1}
Appearance	soft, white powder
Odor	slight, characteristic
Density	1.095 g/cm^{3}, solid
Melting point	120 to 130 °C (248 to 266 °F; 393 to 403 K)
Boiling point	decomposes
Solubility in water	insoluble
Solubility in Ethanol	insoluble
Solubility in ether	insoluble
Solubility in benzene	slightly soluble

Hazards
- GHS labelling
Pictograms	(GHS07: Exclamation mark) (GHS09: Environmental hazard)
Signal word	Warning
Hazard statements	H335, H400, H413
Precautionary statements	P261, P271, P273, P304+P340, P312, P391, P403+P233, P405, P501
NFPA 704 (fire diamond)	1 2 0
Flash point	277 °C (531 °F; 550 K)
Autoignition temperature	420 °C (788 °F; 693 K)
- NIOSH (US health exposure limits)
PEL (Permissible)	TWA 15 mg/m^{3} (total) TWA 5 mg/m^{3} (resp)
REL (Recommended)	TWA 10 mg/m^{3} (total) TWA 5 mg/m^{3} (resp)
IDLH (Immediate danger)	N.D.
- Except where otherwise noted, data are given for materials in their standard state (at 25 °C [77 °F], 100 kPa). verify (what is ?) Infobox references

Zinc stearate describes compounds of zinc and stearate (C_{17}H_{35}CO^{−}_{2}). The idealized zinc stearate has the formula Zn(O_{2}CC_{17}H_{35})_{2}, i.e. Zn2+ bound to stearate. In analogy to basic zinc acetate zinc stearate is Zn_{4}O(O_{2}CR)_{6}, consisting of a Zn_{4}O^{6+} core with carboxylate ligands spanning the edges. Differentiating these two formulas is difficult. Both would be classified as "zinc soaps". In this context, soap is used in its formal sense, a metal salt of a fatty acid: in this case stearic acid. All zinc stearates are white solid that repels water. It is insoluble in polar solvents such as alcohol and ether but soluble in aromatic hydrocarbons (e.g., benzene) and chlorinated hydrocarbons when heated. It is the most powerful mold release agent among all metal soaps. It contains no electrolyte and has a hydrophobic effect. Its main application areas are the plastics and rubber industry, where it is used as a releasing agent and lubricant which can be easily incorporated.

== Applications ==
Zinc stearate is widely used as a release agent for the production of many kinds of objects: rubber, polyurethane, polyester processing system, powder metallurgy. These applications exploit its "non-stick" properties. In cosmetics, zinc stearate is a lubricant and thickening agent used to improve texture.

It is an "activator" for accelerated rubber sulfur vulcanization. As discovered in the early days of vulcanization, zinc has a beneficial effect on the reaction of the sulfur with the polyolefin. The stearate is a form of zinc that is highly soluble in the nonpolar medium of the polyolefins.

Being lipophilic, it functions as a phase transfer catalyst for the saponification of fats.

It is a component of some paints, imparting gloss and body. It is used in many primers, for leveling-properties and for improved sanding-qualities.

As a chief ingredient in "fanning powder", it is used by magicians performing card manipulation to decrease the friction between playing cards.
