= Glycol stearate =

Names
- Preferred IUPAC name 2-Hydroxyethyl octadecanoate
- Other names Ethylene glycol monostearate; Glycol monostearate; Octadecanoic acid, 2-hydroxyethyl ester; 2-Hydroxyethyl stearate; Stearic acid, 2-hydroxyethyl ester

Identifiers
CAS Number	111-60-4
3D model (JSmol)	Interactive image
ChEBI	CHEBI:167626
ChemSpider	23148
ECHA InfoCard	100.003.534
EC Number	203-886-9
KEGG	D01542
PubChem CID	24762
UNII	0324G66D0E
CompTox Dashboard (EPA)	DTXSID6027715 DTXSID5026881, DTXSID6027715
- InChI: InChI=1S/C20H40O3/c1-2-3-4-5-6-7-8-9-10-11-12-13-14-15-16-17-20(22)23-19-18-21/h21H,2-19H2,1H3 Key: RFVNOJDQRGSOEL-UHFFFAOYSA-N; InChI=1/C20H40O3/c1-2-3-4-5-6-7-8-9-10-11-12-13-14-15-16-17-20(22)23-19-18-21/h21H,2-19H2,1H3 Key: RFVNOJDQRGSOEL-UHFRFAOYAH
- SMILES: O=C(OCCO)CCCCCCCCCCCCCCCCC

Properties
Chemical formula	C_{20}H_{40}O_{3}
Molar mass	328.537 g·mol^{−1}
Melting point	55 to 60 °C (131 to 140 °F; 328 to 333 K)
Boiling point	> 400 °C (752 °F; 673 K)

Hazards
- GHS labelling
Pictograms	(GHS07: Exclamation mark)
Signal word	Warning
Hazard statements	H315, H319, H335
Precautionary statements	P261, P264, P271, P280, P302+P352, P304+P340, P305+P351+P338, P312, P321, P332+P313, P337+P313, P362, P403+P233, P405, P501
- Except where otherwise noted, data are given for materials in their standard state (at 25 °C [77 °F], 100 kPa). verify (what is ?) Infobox references

Glycol stearate (glycol monostearate or ethylene glycol monostearate) is an organic compound with the molecular formula C_{20}H_{40}O_{3}. It is the ester of stearic acid and ethylene glycol. It is used as an ingredient in many types of personal care products and cosmetics including shampoos, hair conditioners, and skin lotions.

== See also ==
- Glycol distearate
