= Testosterone palmitate =

Chemical compound

Clinical data
- Other names: Testosterone hexadecanoate; Testosterone 17β-palmitate; Androst-4-en-17β-ol-3-one 17β-palmitate
- Routes of administration: Oral, intramuscular injection

Identifiers
- IUPAC name: [(8R,9S,10R,13S,14S,17S)-10,13-Dimethyl-3-oxo-1,2,6,7,8,9,11,12,14,15,16,17-dodecahydrocyclopenta[a]phenanthren-17-yl] hexadecanoate
- CAS Number: 991-20-8
- PubChem CID: 164765
- ChemSpider: 144440
- UNII: UV7U6AQ9KP
- CompTox Dashboard (EPA): DTXSID00912871

Chemical and physical data
- Formula: C_{35}H_{58}O_{3}
- Molar mass: 526.846 g·mol^{−1}
- 3D model (JSmol): Interactive image
- SMILES: CCCCCCCCCCCCCCCC(=O)O[C@H]1CC[C@@H]2[C@@]1(CC[C@H]3[C@H]2CCC4=CC(=O)CC[C@]34C)C
- InChI: InChI=1S/C35H58O3/c1-4-5-6-7-8-9-10-11-12-13-14-15-16-17-33(37)38-32-21-20-30-29-19-18-27-26-28(36)22-24-34(27,2)31(29)23-25-35(30,32)3/h26,29-32H,4-25H2,1-3H3/t29-,30-,31-,32-,34-,35-/m0/s1; Key:OKFBXYQPCPWWRP-SHDAAXGTSA-N

Testosterone palmitate, also known as testosterone hexadecanoate, testosterone 17β-palmitate, and androst-4-en-17β-ol-3-one 17β-palmitate, is an anabolic-androgenic steroid (AAS) and an androgen ester – specifically, the C17β palmitate (hexadecanoate) ester of testosterone – which was never marketed. It is a prodrug of testosterone and, when administered via intramuscular injection, is associated with a long-lasting depot effect and extended duration of action.

Testosterone palmitate is a longer-chain ester of testosterone compared to testosterone undecanoate. Relative to testosterone undecanoate, testosterone palmitate shows higher oral bioavailability. However, no free testosterone was observed after administration of testosterone palmitate, suggesting that it is not hydrolyzed as efficiently as testosterone undecanoate. On the other hand, another study found that testosterone palmitate was hydrolyzed in humans.

== See also ==
- Testosterone stearate
