= Testosterone stearate =

Chemical compound

Clinical data
- Other names: Testosterone octadecanoate; Testosterone 17β-stearate; Androst-4-en-17β-ol-3-one 17β-stearate
- Routes of administration: Oral, intramuscular injection

Identifiers
- IUPAC name: [(8R,9S,10R,13S,14S,17S)-10,13-Dimethyl-3-oxo-1,2,6,7,8,9,11,12,14,15,16,17-dodecahydrocyclopenta[a]phenanthren-17-yl] octadecanoate
- CAS Number: 6024-71-1
- PubChem CID: 57463467
- ChemSpider: 58539759
- CompTox Dashboard (EPA): DTXSID001336955

Chemical and physical data
- Formula: C_{37}H_{62}O_{3}
- Molar mass: 554.900 g·mol^{−1}
- 3D model (JSmol): Interactive image
- SMILES: CCCCCCCCCCCCCCCCCC(=O)O[C@H]1CC[C@@H]2[C@@]1(CC[C@H]3[C@H]2CCC4=CC(=O)CC[C@]34C)C
- InChI: InChI=1S/C37H62O3/c1-4-5-6-7-8-9-10-11-12-13-14-15-16-17-18-19-35(39)40-34-23-22-32-31-21-20-29-28-30(38)24-26-36(29,2)33(31)25-27-37(32,34)3/h28,31-34H,4-27H2,1-3H3/t31-,32-,33-,34-,36-,37-/m0/s1; Key:FHJSGESOWQSDBH-MXFPRFFXSA-N

Testosterone stearate, also known as testosterone octadecanoate, testosterone 17β-stearate, and androst-4-en-17β-ol-3-one 17β-stearate, is an injected anabolic-androgenic steroid (AAS) and an androgen ester – specifically, the C17β stearate (octadecanoate) ester of testosterone – which was never marketed. It is a prodrug of testosterone and, when administered via intramuscular injection, is associated with a long-lasting depot effect and extended duration of action. Testosterone stearate may occur naturally in the body.

It has been said that with longer-chain esters of testosterone like testosterone stearate, the duration of action may be so protracted that the magnitude of effect with typical doses may be too low to be appreciable.

== See also ==
- Testosterone isobutyrate
- Testosterone palmitate
- Testosterone propionate
- Testosterone undecanoate
