= Defoamer =

Chemical additive that reduces and hinders the formation of foam in liquids

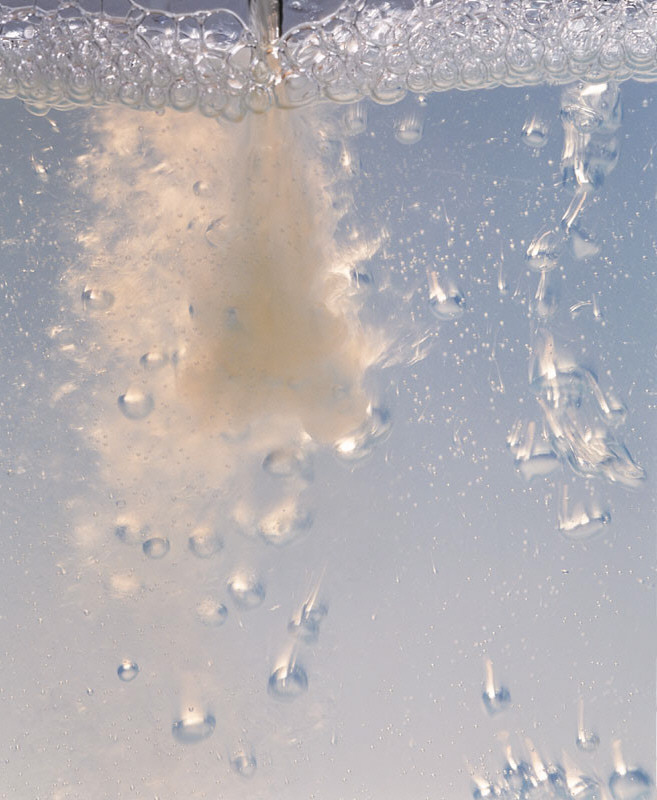
Dosage of defoamer

A defoamer or an anti-foaming agent is a chemical additive that reduces and hinders the formation of foam in industrial process liquids. The terms anti-foam agent and defoamer are often used interchangeably. Strictly speaking, defoamers eliminate existing foam and anti-foamers prevent the formation of further foam. Commonly used agents are insoluble oils, polydimethylsiloxanes and other silicones, certain alcohols, stearates and glycols. The additive is used to prevent formation of foam or is added to break a foam already formed.

In industrial processes, foams pose serious problems. They cause defects on surface coatings and prevent the efficient filling of containers. A variety of chemical formulae are available to prevent formation of foams.

== Properties ==
Generally a defoamer is insoluble in the foaming medium and has surface active properties. An essential feature of a defoamer product is a low viscosity and a facility to spread rapidly on foamy surfaces. It has affinity to the air-liquid surface where it destabilizes the foam lamellas. This causes rupture of the air bubbles and breakdown of surface foam. Entrained air bubbles are agglomerated, and the larger bubbles rise to the surface of the bulk liquid more quickly.

== History ==
The first defoamers were aimed at breaking down visible foam at the surface. Kerosene, fuel oil and other light oil products were used to break down foam. Vegetable oils also found some use. Fatty alcohols (C7 – C22) were effective but expensive antifoams. They were added to oil products to boost the efficiency. Milk and cream were forebears for modern-day emulsion type defoamers.

During the 1950s, experiments with silicone-based defoamers started. These were based on polydimethylsiloxane (silicone oil) dispersed in water or light oil. Silicone oils worked well, but caused surface disturbances in many applications like paints and papermaking. In 1963 the first antifoams with hydrophobic particles (hydrophobic silica) in light oil were patented. In the early 1970s, hydrophobic waxes like ethylene bis stearamide dispersed in oils developed. These types of defoamers were very efficient, but the oil crisis of 1973 made these too expensive and resulted in a push for reduction of the oil content. The solution was adding water. So water-extended (water in oil emulsion) and water-based (oil in water emulsion) defoamers appeared.

The development of silicone-based defoamers has continued, using different emulsifiers and modified silicone oils. In the early 1990s, silicone emulsion defoamers that caused less surface disturbance were used in the wood pulping industry with great success. These caused better washing, reduced biological oxygen demand (BOD) in effluent and reduced deposits.

== Classification ==
=== Oil-based defoamers ===
Oil-based defoamers have an oil carrier. The oil might be mineral oil, vegetable oil or any other oil that is insoluble in the foaming medium, except silicone oil. An oil-based defoamer also contains a wax and/or hydrophobic silica to boost the performance. Typical waxes are ethylene bis stearamide (EBS), paraffin waxes, ester waxes and fatty alcohol waxes. These products might also have surfactants to improve emulsification and spreading in the foaming medium.

These are heavy duty defoamers and are normally best at knocking down surface foam.

=== Powder defoamers ===
Powder defoamers are in principle oil-based defoamers on a particulate carrier like silica. These are added to powdered products like cement, plaster and detergents.

=== Water-based defoamers ===
Water-based defoamers are different types of oils and waxes dispersed in a water base. The oils are often mineral oil or vegetable oils and the waxes are long chain fatty alcohol, fatty acid soaps or esters. These are normally best as deaerators, which means they are best at releasing entrained air.

=== Silicone-based defoamers ===
Silicone-based defoamers are polymers with silicon backbones. These might be delivered as an oil or a water-based emulsion. The silicone compound consists of a hydrophobic silica dispersed in a silicone oil. Emulsifiers are added to ensure that the silicone spreads fast and well in the foaming medium. The silicone compound might also contain silicone glycols and other modified silicone fluids.

These are also heavy duty defoamers and are good at both knocking down surface foam and releasing entrained air.

Polydimethylsiloxane is a widely used antifoaming agent.

Silicone-based defoamers are also suitable in non-aqueous foaming systems like crude oil and oil refining. For very demanding applications fluorosilicones may be suitable.

EO/PO-based defoamers contain polyethylene glycol and polypropylene glycol copolymers. They are delivered as oils, water solutions, or water-based emulsions. EO/PO copolymers normally have good dispersing properties and are often well suited when deposit problems are an issue.

=== Alkyl polyacrylates ===
Alkyl polyacrylates are suitable for use as defoamers in non-aqueous systems where air release is more important than the breakdown of surface foam. These defoamers are often delivered in a solvent carrier like petroleum distillates.

=== Glycol based defoamers ===
Combination polyglycol and fatty acid is used as defoamer in many applications such as control of foam in aqueous alkaline protein, starch, synthetic resin solutions.

== Industrial problems ==
The most noticeable form of foam is foam floating on the stock surface. It is easy to monitor and relatively easy to handle and is more a cosmetic issue. Surface foam may cause problems with liquid levels and give overflow leading to pools of oils around the equipment which is a safety concern. Additionally, this might reduce the process speed and availability of process equipment. The main mechanical problem tends to be when foam enters the system as air is a poor lubricant, meaning metal to metal contact can occur.

=== Mechanical problem factors ===
Air or other gas dissolved in the fluid can come out of solution as small bubbles (entrained air). If these small bubbles have sufficient buoyancy, they can rise to the surface and together form foam. Mechanical factors that may generate entrapped air:

- Leaky seals on pumps
- High pressure pumps
- Poor system design (tank, pump inlet, outlet and manifold design)
- Pressure release

=== Foam in process and coolant liquids ===
Foam, entrained and dissolved air that are present in coolants and processing liquids, may cause various kinds of problems, including:

- Reduction of pump efficiency (cavitation)
- Reduced capacity of pumps and storage tanks
- Bacterial growth
- Dirt flotation / deposit formation
- Reduced effectiveness of the fluid solution(s)
- Eventual downtime to clean tanks
- Drainage problems in sieves and filters
- Formation problems (i.e. in a paper mill it may cause the fibers to form an inhomogeneous sheet)
- Cost of replenishing the liquid
- Cost of entire material rejection due to imperfections

== Test methods ==
There are several ways to test defoamers.

The easiest is looking at the surface foam. All that is needed is a system for generating foam. This might be done with a round pumping system with a nozzle and a cylinder or an air injection system into a cylinder. The cylinder is fitted with a scale to measure the foam height. This equipment may have a heater to control the temperature.

Entrained air can be tested with similar equipment that has a density meter that can record changes of the liquid density over time.

Drainage can be tested with a filter system for measuring the time to drain a liquid through the filter. The filter might be pressurized or have a vacuum.

== Applications ==
=== Detergents ===
Anti-foams are added in certain types of detergents to reduce foaming that might decrease the action of the detergent. For example, dishwasher detergents have to be low foaming for the dishwasher to work properly. Defoamer is added into the recovery tank of carpet extractors to prevent too much-foaming damage to the vac motor.

=== Food ===
When used as an ingredient in food, antifoaming agents are intended to curb effusion or effervescence in preparation or serving. The agents are included in a variety of foods and in materials for food preparation; McDonald's includes polydimethylsiloxane (a type of silicone) in its oil to mitigate hazardous splashes of oil caused by foaming in fryers, so it has been listed as an ingredient in their chicken nuggets, french fries, and other fried menu items.

=== Industrial use ===
Defoamers are used in many industrial processes and products: wood pulp, paper, paint, industrial wastewater treatment, food processing, oil drilling, machine tool industry, oils cutting tools, hydraulics, etc. Besides, for many building materials, such as cement, mortar, self-leveling compound, or tile adhesive, foam can be an unwanted side effect that disrupts the subsequent work steps and may even undermine the stability of the construction. It needs defoamers to eliminate or reduce the formation of bubbles and ensure smooth processing of the compound.

=== Pharmaceuticals ===
Antifoaming agents are also sold commercially to relieve bloating. A familiar example is the drug simethicone, which is the active ingredient in drugs such as Gas-X.

== See also ==
- Foam
- Foaming agent
