= Ethylene bis(stearamide) =

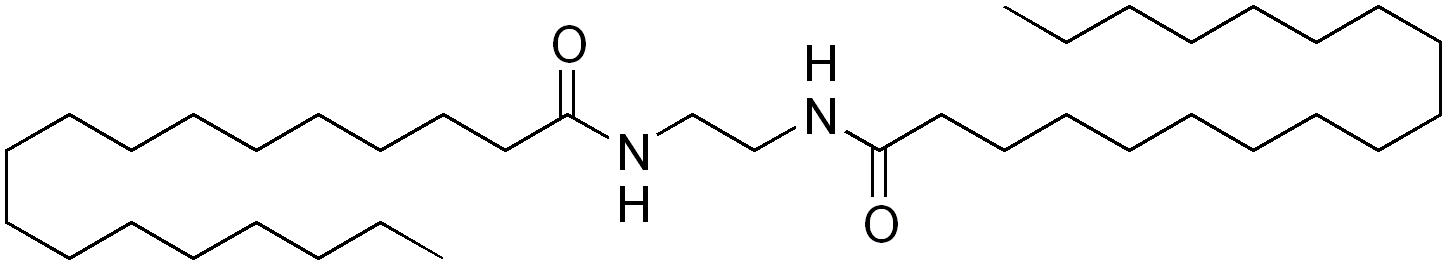
- Skeletal formula of ethylene bis stearamide

Names
- Preferred IUPAC name N,N′-(Ethane-1,2-diyl)di(octadecanamide)
- Other names: 1,2-Bis(stearoylamino) ethane; N,N′-1,2-Ethanediylbisoctadecanamide; N,N′-Ethylenedi(stearamide); Ethylene distearylamide

Identifiers
CAS Number	110-30-5
3D model (JSmol)	Interactive image
Abbreviations	EBS
ChemSpider	7753
ECHA InfoCard	100.003.415
EC Number	203-755-6
MeSH	N,N'-ethylene+distearylamide
PubChem CID	8044
UNII	603RP8TB9A
CompTox Dashboard (EPA)	DTXSID4026840
- InChI: InChI=1S/C38H76N2O2/c1-3-5-7-9-11-13-15-17-19-21-23-25-27-29-31-33-37(41)39-35-36-40-38(42)34-32-30-28-26-24-22-20-18-16-14-12-10-8-6-4-2/h3-36H2,1-2H3,(H,39,41)(H,40,42) Key: RKISUIUJZGSLEV-UHFFFAOYSA-N
- SMILES: CCCCCCCCCCCCCCCCCC(=O)NCCNC(=O)CCCCCCCCCCCCCCCCC

Properties
Chemical formula	C_{38}H_{76}N_{2}O_{2}
Molar mass	593.038 g·mol^{−1}
Appearance	White, waxy crystals
Odor	Odourless
Melting point	144 to 146 °C (291 to 295 °F; 417 to 419 K)
Boiling point	260 °C (500 °F; 533 K)

Hazards
- GHS labelling
Pictograms	(GHS07: Exclamation mark)
Signal word	Warning
Hazard statements	H315, H319, H335
Precautionary statements	P261, P305+P351+P338
Flash point	280 °C (536 °F; 553 K)

Related compounds
Related alkanamides	Stearamidopropyl dimethylamine
- Except where otherwise noted, data are given for materials in their standard state (at 25 °C [77 °F], 100 kPa). verify (what is ?) Infobox references

Ethylene bis stearamide (EBS) is an organic compound with the formula (CH_{2}NHC(O)C_{17}H_{35})_{2}. It is a low toxicity waxy white solid that is commonly used as a release agent. The compound is derived from the reaction of ethylenediamine and stearic acid.

== Applications ==
EBS is a synthetic wax used as a dispersing agent or internal/external lubricant for benefits in plastic applications to facilitate and stabilize the dispersion of solid compounding materials to enhance processability, to decrease friction and abrasion of the polymer surface, and to contribute color stability and polymer degradation.

It is also used in process industries as release agent and antistatic agent for the production of thermoplastics, and wiring. It is used in powder metallurgy.
