= Hydrofuramide =

Names
- IUPAC name (E)-1-(Furan-2-yl)-N-[furan-2-yl-[(E)-furan-2-ylmethylideneamino]methyl]methanimine
- Other names N,N'-Difurfurylidene-2-furanmethanediamine

Identifiers
CAS Number	494-47-3
3D model (JSmol)	Interactive image
ChemSpider	7844541
ECHA InfoCard	100.007.083
EC Number	207-790-8
PubChem CID	9570073
UNII	BI73W105SX
CompTox Dashboard (EPA)	DTXSID00871696 DTXSID30877702, DTXSID00871696
- InChI: InChI=1S/C15H12N2O3/c1-4-12(18-7-1)10-16-15(14-6-3-9-20-14)17-11-13-5-2-8-19-13/h1-11,15H/b16-10+,17-11+ Key: CYGDSXFTXXFMNI-OTYYAQKOSA-N; InChI=1/C15H12N2O3/c1-4-12(18-7-1)10-16-15(14-6-3-9-20-14)17-11-13-5-2-8-19-13/h1-11,15H/b16-10+,17-11+ Key: CYGDSXFTXXFMNI-OTYYAQKOBP
- SMILES: C1=COC(=C1)/C=N/C(/N=C/C2=CC=CO2)C3=CC=CO3

Properties
Chemical formula	C_{15}H_{12}N_{2}O_{3}
Molar mass	268.272 g·mol^{−1}
Appearance	crystals
Density	1.23 g/mL @ 20 °C
Melting point	118 to 119 °C (244 to 246 °F; 391 to 392 K)
- Except where otherwise noted, data are given for materials in their standard state (at 25 °C [77 °F], 100 kPa). Infobox references

Hydrofuramide is a condensation product of three molar equivalents of furfural with two molar equivalents of ammonia. Hydrofuramide is a crystalline solid with a melting point of 118-119 °C. The molecule may be described as a diimine with three pendant furanyl rings. Hydrofuramide is a versatile specialty chemical with applications in diverse areas, including rubber additives, pharmaceutical intermediates, preservatives, and rodenticides.

== Synthesis ==
Hydrofuramide was prepared in 1960 by Kapur via the reaction of furfural with aqueous ammonia in chilled ethanol solution.

== Reactions ==
The reactive imine double bonds of hydrofuramide are easily reduced. Reduction with aqueous sodium borohydride yields N,N-bisfurfuryl-2-furylmethanediamine, useful as an antihypertensive drug compound.

Catalytic hydrogenation of hydrofuramide with Raney nickel in the presence of ammonia in ethanol yields mixtures of furfurylamine and difurfurylamine. By contrast, hydrogenation in acetic acid-ethanol, employing platinum oxide catalyst yielded the tertiary amine tri-furfurylamine after neutralization. Furthermore, lithium aluminium hydride reduction of hydrofuramide yields furfurin, a tetracyclic compound.

== Applications ==
=== Rubber vulcanization ===
Hydrofuramide has shown effectiveness as a synergist with zinc stearate in enhancing the rate of vulcanization of styrene-butadiene rubber. Similar synergistic effect was seen in the vulcanization of natural rubber with hydrofuramide-sulfenamide activator where introduction of hydrofuramide reduced induction time, scorch time, and optimum cure time.

=== Raticide ===
Hydrofuramide has been found to be selectively toxic to rats. For all types of rats the lethal dose is 1 g/kg body weight. The chemical is less toxic to guinea pigs and has little or no toxicity to swine, dogs, cats or birds.

=== Food technology ===
Development of a pink color in a modified Badouin test, employing hydrofuramide, is diagnostic for adulteration of butter with cheap hydrogenated vegetable oil.
