= Fumed silica =

Silicon dioxide with branched chains on micro scale

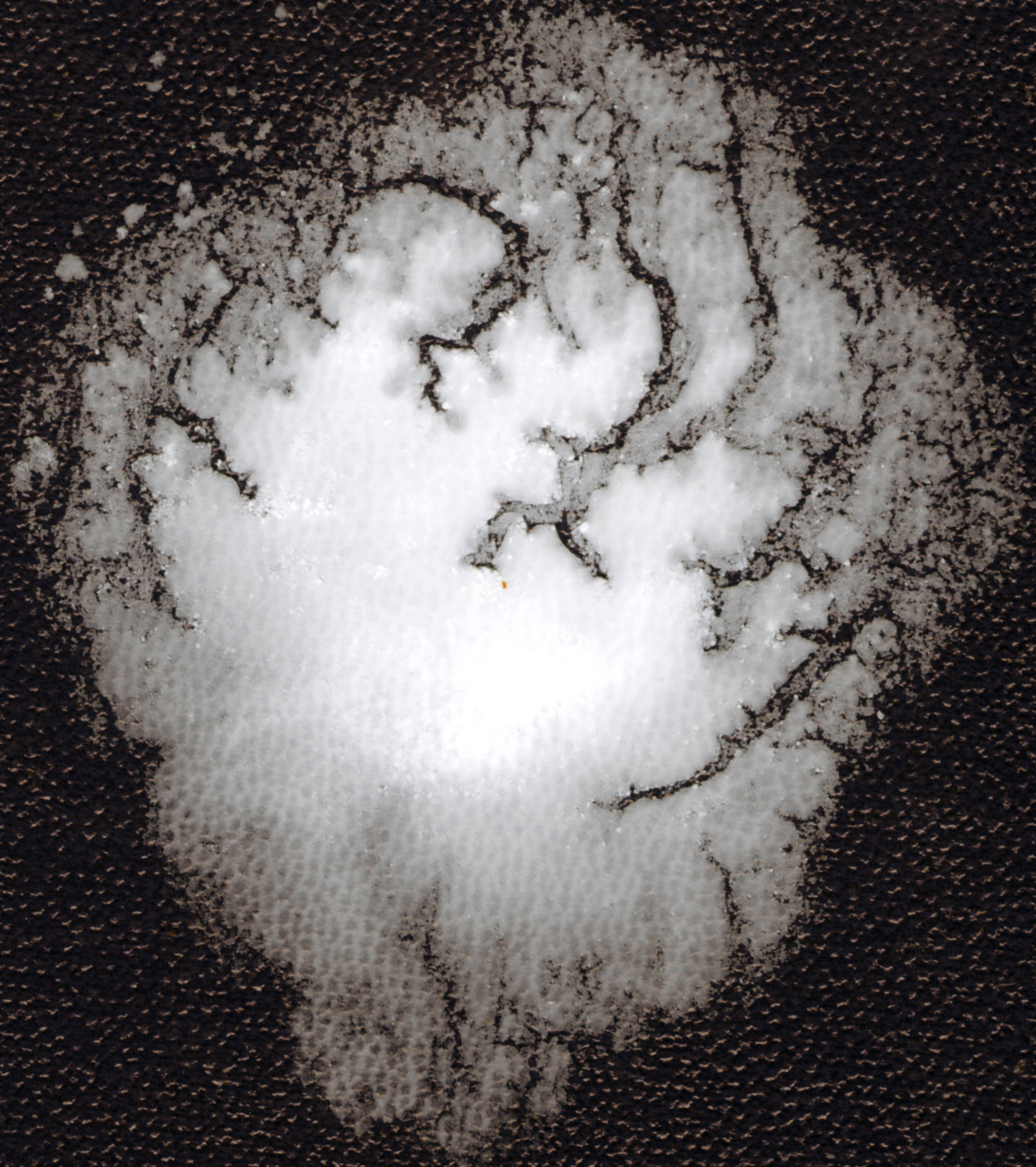
Fumed silica with surface area of 130 m^{2}/g

Fumed silica (CAS number 7631-86-9, also 112945-52-5), also known as pyrogenic silica because it is produced in a flame, consists of microscopic droplets of amorphous silica fused into branched, chainlike, three-dimensional secondary particles which then agglomerate into tertiary particles. The resulting powder has an extremely low bulk density and high surface area. Its three-dimensional structure results in viscosity-increasing, thixotropic behavior when used as a thickener or reinforcing filler.

== Properties ==
Fumed silica has a very strong thickening effect. Primary particle size is 5–50 nm. The particles are non-porous and have a surface area of 50–600 m^{2}/g. The density is 160–190 kg/m^{3}.

== Production ==

Fumed silica is made from flame pyrolysis of silicon tetrachloride or from quartz sand vaporized in a 3,000 °C (5,400 °F) electric arc. Major global producers are Evonik (who sells it under the name Aerosil), Cabot Corporation (Cab-O-Sil), Wacker Chemie (HDK), Dow Corning, Heraeus (Zandosil), Tokuyama Corporation (Reolosil), OCI (Konasil), Orisil (Orisil) and Xunyuchem(XYSIL).

== Applications ==
Fumed silica serves as a universal thickening agent and an anticaking agent (free-flow agent) in powders. Like silica gel, it serves as a desiccant. It is used in cosmetics for its light-diffusing properties. It is used as a light abrasive, in products like toothpaste. Other uses include filler in silicone elastomer and viscosity adjustment in paints, coatings, printing inks, adhesives and unsaturated polyester resins. Fumed silica readily forms a network structure within bitumen and enhances its elasticity.

== Health issues ==
While fumed silica is not listed as a carcinogen by OSHA, IARC, or NTP, it can easily become airborne due to its fineness and thinness, making it at the very least an inhalation hazard capable of causing irritation.

== See also ==
- Hydrophobic silica
- Precipitated silica
- Nanoparticles
