= Release agent =

Substance applied to prevent adhesion to a surface

Polydimethylsiloxane (PDMS) is a typical release agent.

A release agent (also mold release agent, release coating, or mold release coating) is a chemical used to prevent other materials from bonding to surfaces. Release agents aid in processes involving mold release, die-cast release, plastic release, adhesive release, and tire and web release. Release agents are one of many additives used in the production of plastics.

Release agents provide a barrier between a molding surface and the substrate, facilitating separation of the cured part from the mold. Without such a barrier, the substrate would become fused to the mold surface, resulting in difficult clean-up and dramatic loss in production efficiency. Even when a release agent is used, factors such as irregular applications or improper release agent choice may have a dramatic effect on the quality and consistency of the finished product. Many kinds of release agents are used. They are waxes, fatty ester, silicones, and metallic soaps.

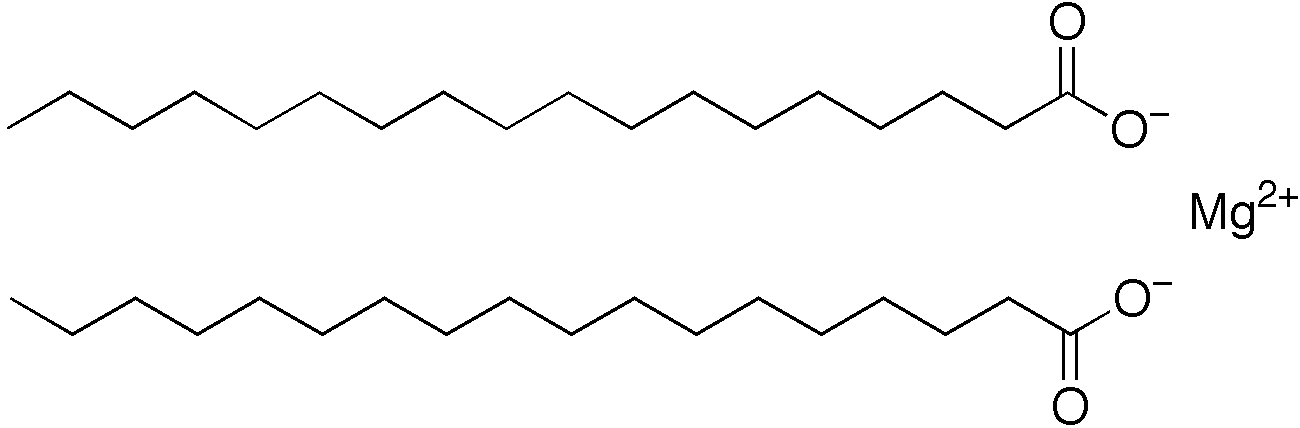
Magnesium stearate is a release agent.

== Functionality ==
=== Cosolvent ===
Volatile organic compound (VOC) reduction along with the elimination of health and safety concerns surrounding solvent-based release agents were primary drivers in the development of cosolvent mold release. Cosolvent based release agents combine the benefits of a solvent based system and the safety of water-based release agents.

=== Semi-permanent ===
One of the key attributes of a release agent is its degree of permanence: how long will it last before reapplication is necessary. A semi-permanent release agent does not need to be reapplied for every cycle of a molding operation and even works better when it is not over-applied to the mold surface.

How many releases can be achieved before reapplication is necessary varies by process, material, and application method. In order to achieve multiple releases per application, the semi-permanent release coating generally must be applied to a clean, dry surface free of dirt, rust, grime or previous coatings. This allows the release agent to properly bond to the mold and mold tooling, improving durability and longevity of the coating.

=== Sacrificial ===
Sacrificial coatings must be applied before every cycle of a molding operation and are therefore considered more labor intensive. Most molders will prefer semi-permanent coatings to sacrificial coatings, especially when molding rubber and plastic parts. These coatings contain fewer solid ingredients, and thus do not last as long as semi-permanent coatings.

=== Water- or solvent-based ===
Release agents may be water or solvent-based and use of either will depend on the personal preference of the molder, plant safety regulations, hazardous materials shipping costs, state, local, or federal regulations, and/or desired drying times of the release coating. Water-based die lubricant (WBD) has been used for about 40 years. All die casting machines have been designed with the use of WBD. Water-based release coatings generally dry slower than solvent-based release agents but present fewer health and safety concerns. Water-based release agents will be less expensive to ship because of their inherently non-flammable nature and satisfy most plant-safety goals. Solvent-based release coatings dry almost instantly but present serious health and safety concerns. Fumes from solvent-based release agents may be hazardous without proper ventilation of the work area. Most solvents used in release agents are flammable.

== Applications ==
=== Asphalt ===
Asphalt release agents are chemical products developed and manufactured as alternatives to diesel and solvents commonly used for cleaning equipment associated with hot mix asphaltic concrete (HMAC) production and placement on government and private facilities. The United States Oil Pollution Act of 1980 was used as the foundation to build the current program. The intent of asphalt release agents is to eliminate harmful stripping products that come into contact with bituminous products and strip the asphalt (binding agent) from the aggregates causing potholes, raveling, and other detrimental pavement failures.

=== Concrete ===
In the concrete construction industry, form release agents prevent the adhesion of freshly placed concrete to the forming surface, usually plywood, overlaid plywood, steel or aluminum. In this application, there are two types of release agents available: barrier and reactive.

Barrier release agents prevent adhesion by the development of a physical film or barrier between the forming surface and the concrete.

Reactive release agents are chemically active and work by the process of a chemical reaction between the release agent and the free limes available in fresh concrete. A soapy film is created which prevents adhesion. Because it is a chemically reactive process, there is generally little to no residue or non-reacted product left on the forming surface or concrete which provides for a cleaner process.

=== Food processing ===
Release agents are used to aid in the separation of food from a cooking container after baking or roasting. Traditionally fat or flour have been used, but in industrial food processing other chemicals might be used. The application is called bakery release.

In bakery paper or greaseproof paper release agents like catalyst-cured silicone release coatings may be used.

=== Metal casting ===
Mold release agent also can be used in die casting or metal forging process of metal, such as aluminum, aluminum alloy, zinc, zinc alloy, magnesium, etc. Graphite or talc is often used.

=== Paper ===
In industrial papermaking release agents are used to get slip effect of the paper from the processing equipment. A release agent may be applied on the process rolls (like the yankee dryer) or in the paper coating.

Some paper types are made with low surface energy release coatings:

- Release liners for pressure-sensitive adhesive laminates and tapes
- Casting papers
- General industrial release papers
- Food-grade release and packaging papers

=== Pharmaceuticals ===
Release agents (e.g., magnesium stearate) are added to powdered and granulated drug compositions, to serve as a lubricant for mold release purposes during tabletting.

=== Plastics ===
Release agents are coated onto some plastic films to prevent adhesives from bonding to the plastic surface. Some release agents, also known as de-molding agent, form oil, parting agent or form releaser, are substances used in molding and casting that aid in the separation of a mould from the material being moulded and reduce imperfections in the moulded surface. Slip Additives are similarly used to prevent thin polyolefin films from adhering to metal surfaces (or each other) during processing, for instance in film blowing.

=== Rubber ===
There are two types of release agents used in the molding of rubber products. Both are silicone based. The decision on which to use has to do with lubricity and release. Water-diluted silicone is used when you have rubber sliding over a hot mold (sheets or slugs). The silicone keeps the rubber from sticking to the mold but just as important it lubricates the rubber so it will slide over the hot mold as it is loaded. Diluted silicone typically has to be applied every cycle. Semi-permanent mold release builds a silicone matrix on the mold that becomes a barrier between the rubber and the metal surface of the mold. The matrix is created by the other ingredients in the semi-permanent mold release. Applications of semi-permanent mold release vary from every cycle to once daily applications depending on the compound being molded and the design and quality of the mold. Silicone-based rubber products, however, require a non-silicone based releasing agent.

== Blocking agents ==
Related to release agents are blocking agents. These chemicals aid in keeping collections of polymeric materials from sticking together. Typical that are used for stacked sheets or rolls of plastics. They inhibit cold flow.
