= Sodium stearate =

Names
- Preferred IUPAC name Sodium octadecanoate

Identifiers
CAS Number	822-16-2
3D model (JSmol)	Interactive image
ChEBI	CHEBI:132109
ChemSpider	12639
ECHA InfoCard	100.011.354
EC Number	212-490-5
PubChem CID	2724691
UNII	QU7E2XA9TG
CompTox Dashboard (EPA)	DTXSID9027318
- InChI: InChI=1S/C18H36O2.Na/c1-2-3-4-5-6-7-8-9-10-11-12-13-14-15-16-17-18(19)20;/h2-17H2,1H3,(H,19,20);/q;+1/p-1 Key: RYYKJJJTJZKILX-UHFFFAOYSA-M; InChI=1/C18H36O2.Na/c1-2-3-4-5-6-7-8-9-10-11-12-13-14-15-16-17-18(19)20;/h2-17H2,1H3,(H,19,20);/q;+1/p-1 Key: RYYKJJJTJZKILX-REWHXWOFAA
- SMILES: [Na+].[O-]C(=O)CCCCCCCCCCCCCCCCC

Properties
Chemical formula	C_{18}H_{35}NaO_{2}
Molar mass	306.466 g·mol^{−1}
Appearance	white solid
Odor	slight, tallow-like odor
Density	1.02 g/cm^{3}
Melting point	245 to 255 °C (473 to 491 °F; 518 to 528 K)
Solubility in water	soluble
Solubility	slightly soluble in ethanediol

Hazards
NFPA 704 (fire diamond)	2 1 0
Flash point	176 °C (349 °F; 449 K)
- Except where otherwise noted, data are given for materials in their standard state (at 25 °C [77 °F], 100 kPa). verify (what is ?) Infobox references

Sodium stearate (IUPAC: sodium octadecanoate) is the sodium salt of stearic acid. This white solid is the most common soap. It is found in many types of solid deodorants, rubbers, latex paints, and inks. It is also a component of some food additives and food flavorings.

== Production ==
Sodium stearate is produced as a major component of soap upon saponification of oils and fats. The percentage of the sodium stearate depends on the ingredient fats. Tallow is especially high in stearic acid content (as the triglyceride), whereas most fats only contain a few percent. The idealized equation for the formation of sodium stearate from stearin (the triglyceride of stearic acid) follows:

(C_{17}H_{35}CO_{2})_{3}C_{3}H_{5} + 3 NaOH → C_{3}H_{5}(OH)_{3} + 3 C_{17}H_{35}CO_{2}Na

Sodium stearate can also be made by neutralizing stearic acid with sodium hydroxide.

C_{17}H_{35}COOH + NaOH → C_{17}H_{35}COONa + H_{2}O

== Safety and environmental considerations ==
Stearate salts, as found in many commercial soaps are of low toxicity, hence their wide use in domestic settings. They do pose some problems for wastewater treatment as they biodegrade relatively slowly and impose a high biological oxygen demand.
