= Stearic acid =

18-Carbon fatty acid

- Skeletal formula of stearic acid

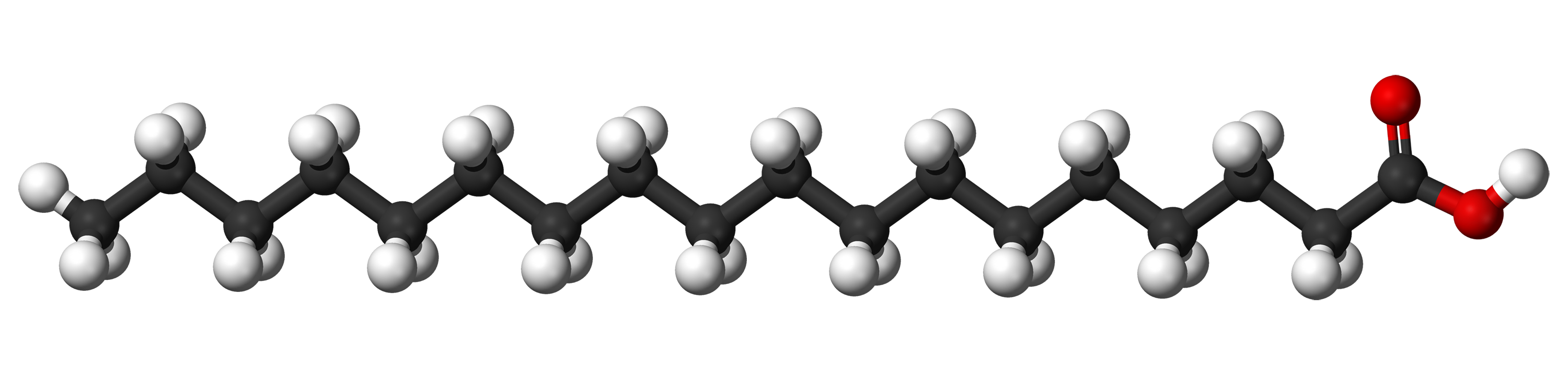
- Ball-and-stick model of stearic acid

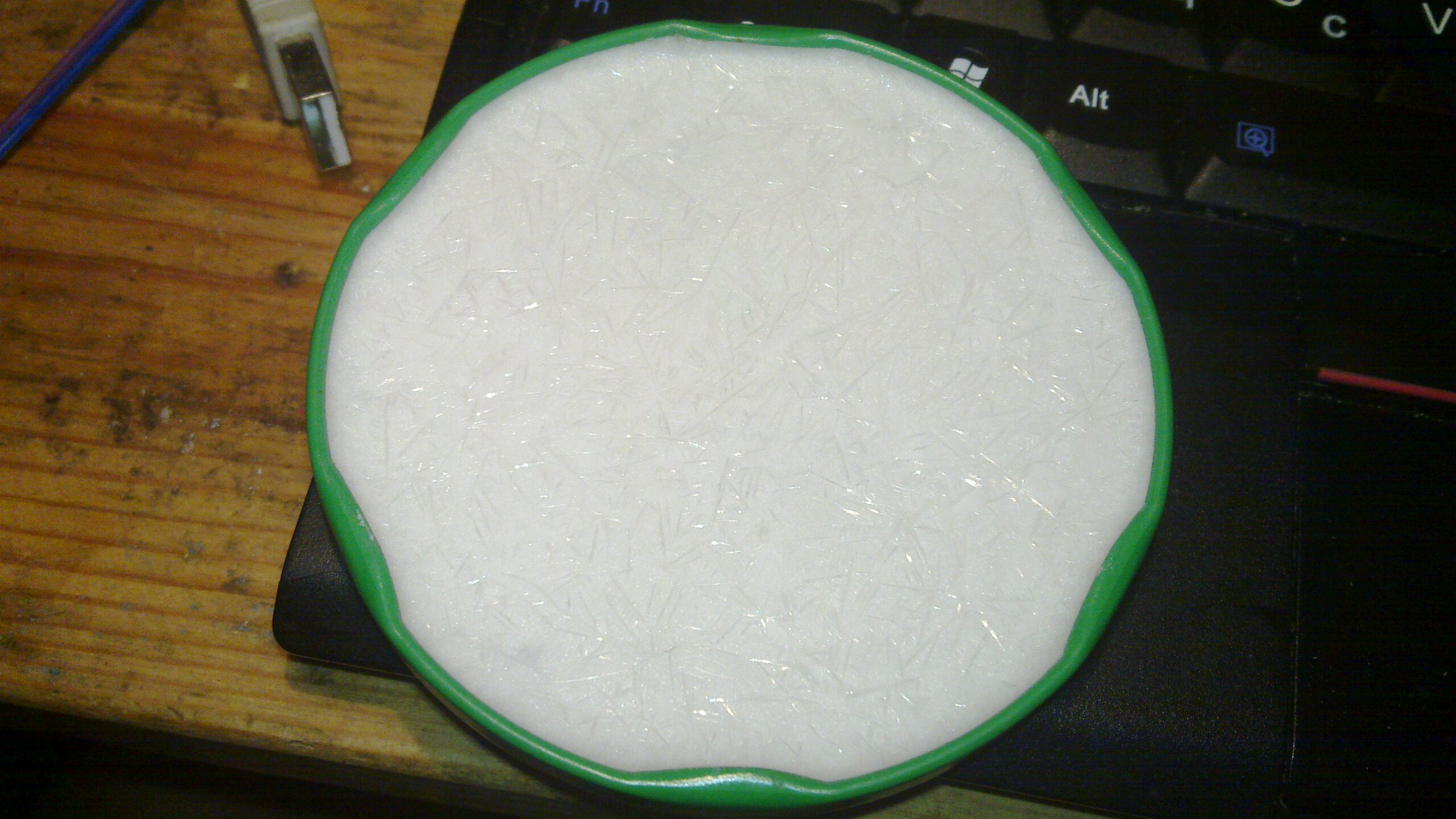
- Stearic acid

Names
- Preferred IUPAC name Octadecanoic acid
- Other names: C18:0 (lipid numbers)

Identifiers
CAS Number	57-11-4
3D model (JSmol)	Interactive image
Beilstein Reference	608585
ChEBI	CHEBI:28842
ChEMBL	ChEMBL46403
ChemSpider	5091
DrugBank	DB03193
ECHA InfoCard	100.000.285
EC Number	200-313-4
Gmelin Reference	11738
IUPHAR/BPS	3377
KEGG	C01530
PubChem CID	5281
RTECS number	WI2800000
UNII	4ELV7Z65AP
CompTox Dashboard (EPA)	DTXSID8021642
- InChI: InChI=1S/C18H36O2/c1-2-3-4-5-6-7-8-9-10-11-12-13-14-15-16-17-18(19)20/h2-17H2,1H3,(H,19,20) Key: QIQXTHQIDYTFRH-UHFFFAOYSA-N
- SMILES: CCCCCCCCCCCCCCCCCC(=O)O

Properties
Chemical formula	C_{18}H_{36}O_{2}
Molar mass	284.484 g·mol^{−1}
Appearance	White solid
Odor	Pungent, oily
Density	0.9408 g/cm^{3} (20 °C); 0.847 g/cm^{3} (70 °C)
Melting point	69.3 °C (156.7 °F; 342.4 K)
Boiling point	361 °C (682 °F; 634 K) decomposes 232 °C (450 °F; 505 K) at 15 mmHg
Solubility in water	0.0018 g/100 g (0 °C); 0.0029 g/100 g (20 °C); 0.0034 g/100 g (30 °C); 0.0042 g/100 g (45 °C); 0.0050 g/100 g (60 °C)
Solubility	Soluble in: alkyl acetates; alcohols; methyl formate; phenyls; carbon disulfide; carbon tetrachloride
Solubility in dichloromethane	3.58 g/100 g (25 °C); 8.85 g/100 g (30 °C); 18.3 g/100 g (35 °C)
Solubility in hexane	0.5 g/100 g (20 °C); 4.3 g/100 g (30 °C); 19 g/100 g (40 °C); 79.2 g/100 g (50 °C); 303 g/100 g (60 °C)
Solubility in ethanol	1.09 g/100 mL (10 °C); 2.25 g/100 g (20 °C); 5.42 g/100 g (30 °C); 22.7 g/100 g (40 °C); 105 g/100 g (50 °C); 400 g/100 g (60 °C)
Solubility in acetone	4.73 g/100 g
Solubility in chloroform	15.54 g/100 g
Solubility in toluene	13.61 g/100 g
Vapor pressure	0.01 kPa (158 °C); 0.46 kPa (200 °C); 16.9 kPa (300 °C)
Magnetic susceptibility (χ)	−220.8·10^{−6} cm^{3}/mol
Thermal conductivity	0.173 W/m·K (70 °C); 0.166 W/m·K (100 °C)
Refractive index (n_{D})	1.4299 (80 °C)

Structure
Crystal structure	B-form = Monoclinic
Space group	B-form = P2_{1}/a
Point group	B-form = C^{s}_{2h}
Lattice constant	a = 5.591 Å, b = 7.404 Å, c = 49.38 Å (B-form) α = 90°, β = 117.37°, γ = 90°

Thermochemistry
Heat capacity (C)	501.5 J/mol·K
Std molar entropy (S^{⦵}_{298})	435.6 J/mol·K
Std enthalpy of formation (Δ_{f}H^{⦵}_{298})	−947.7 kJ/mol
Std enthalpy of combustion (Δ_{c}H^{⦵}_{298})	−11342.4 kJ/mol

Hazards
- GHS labelling
Pictograms	(GHS07: Exclamation mark)
Signal word	Warning
Hazard statements	H315
Precautionary statements	P264, P280, P302+P352, P321, P332+P317, P362+P364
NFPA 704 (fire diamond)	1 1 0
Flash point	205 °C (401 °F; 478 K)
Autoignition temperature	395 °C; 743 °F; 668 K
- Lethal dose or concentration (LD, LC)
LD_{50} (median dose)	4640 mg/kg (rats, oral); 21.5 mg/kg (rats, intravenous)
- Except where otherwise noted, data are given for materials in their standard state (at 25 °C [77 °F], 100 kPa). Infobox references

Stearic acid (/ˈstɪərɪk/ STEER-ik, /stiˈærɪk/ stee-ARR-ik) is a saturated fatty acid with an 18-carbon chain. The IUPAC name is octadecanoic acid. It is a soft waxy solid with the formula CH_{3}(CH_{2})_{16}COOH. The triglyceride derived from three molecules of stearic acid is called stearin. Stearic acid is a prevalent fatty acid in nature, found in many animal and vegetable fats, but is usually higher in animal fat than vegetable fat. It has a melting point of 69.4 °C (156.9 °F) and a pKa of 4.50.

Its name comes from the Greek word στέαρ "stéar", which means tallow. The salts and esters of stearic acid are called stearates. As its glycerol ester, stearic acid is one of the most common saturated fatty acids found in nature and in the food supply, following palmitic acid. Dietary sources of stearic acid include meat, poultry, fish, eggs, dairy products, and foods prepared with fats; beef tallow, lard, butterfat, cocoa butter, and shea butter are rich fat sources of stearic acid.

== Production ==
In terms of its biosynthesis, stearic acid is produced from palmitoyl-CoA, with malonyl-CoA a two-carbon building block (after decarboxylation).

Stearic acid is obtained from fats and oils by the saponification of the triglycerides using hot water (about 100 °C). The resulting mixture is then distilled. Commercial stearic acid is often a mixture of stearic and palmitic acids, although purified stearic acid is available. Commercially, oleic acid, as found in palm and soy, can be hydrogenated to give stearic acid.

== Uses and occurrence ==
In general, the applications of stearic acid exploit its bifunctional character, with a polar head group that can be attached to metal cations and a nonpolar chain that confers solubility in organic solvents. The combination leads to uses as a surfactant and softening agent. Stearic acid undergoes the typical reactions of saturated carboxylic acids, a notable one being reduction to stearyl alcohol, and esterification with a range of alcohols. This is used in a large range of manufactures, from simple to complex electronic devices.

=== Food ===
Of the saturated fatty acids consumed in the United States, stearic acid consumption is second (26% of total saturated fatty acid intake) to palmitic acid (56% of total saturated fatty acid intake). Stearic acid is more abundant in animal fat (up to 33% in beef liver) than in vegetable fat (typically less than 5%). The important exceptions are the foods cocoa butter (34%) and shea butter, where the stearic acid content (as a triglyceride) is 28–45%. Examples of the use of stearic acid in food manufacturing include baked goods, frozen dairy products, gelatins, puddings, hard candy, and nonalcoholic beverages.

Stearic acid (E number E570) is found in some foods.

=== Soaps and cosmetics ===
Stearic acid is mainly used in the production of detergents, soaps, and cosmetics such as shampoos and shaving cream products. Stearate soap, such as sodium stearate, could be made from stearic acid but instead are usually produced by saponification of stearic acid-containing triglycerides. Esters of stearic acid with ethylene glycol (glycol stearate and glycol distearate) are used to produce a pearly effect in shampoos, soaps, and other cosmetic products.

=== Lubricants, softening and release agents ===
In view of the soft texture of the sodium salt, which is the main component of soap, other salts are also useful for their lubricating properties. Lithium stearate is an important component of grease. The stearate salts of zinc, calcium, cadmium, and lead are used as heat stabilizers for PVC. Stearic acid is used along with castor oil for preparing softeners in textile sizing. They are heated and mixed with caustic potash or caustic soda. Related salts are also commonly used as release agents, e.g. in the production of automobile tires. As an example, it can be used to make castings from a plaster piece mold or waste mold, and to make a mold from a shellacked clay original. In this use, powdered stearic acid is mixed in water and the suspension is brushed onto the surface to be parted after casting. This reacts with the calcium in the plaster to form a thin layer of calcium stearate, which functions as a release agent.

Stearic acid can be converted to zinc stearate, which is used as a lubricant for playing cards (fanning powder) to ensure a smooth motion when fanning. Stearic acid is a common lubricant during injection molding and pressing of ceramic powders.

=== Niche uses ===
Being inexpensive, nontoxic, and fairly inert, stearic acid finds many niche applications. Varied examples of stearic acid use in manufacturing include soaps and greases, household soap products, synthetic rubber, cosmetic and pharmaceutical creams and lotions, candles, phonograph records, lubricants, shoe and metal polishes, food packaging, and rubber compounds.

Stearic acid is used as a negative plate additive in the manufacture of lead-acid batteries. It is added at the rate of 0.6 g per kg of the oxide while preparing the paste. It is believed to enhance the hydrophobicity of the negative plate, particularly during dry-charging process. It also reduces the extension of oxidation of the freshly formed lead (negative active material) when the plates are kept for drying in the open atmosphere after the process of tank formation. As a consequence, the charging time of a dry uncharged battery during initial filling and charging (IFC) is comparatively lower, as compared to a battery assembled with plates which do not contain stearic acid additive. Fatty acids are classic components of candle-making. Stearic acid is used along with simple sugar or corn syrup as a hardener in candies.

== Metabolism ==
An isotope labeling study in humans concluded that the fraction of dietary stearic acid that oxidatively desaturates to oleic acid is 2.4 times higher than the fraction of palmitic acid analogously converted to palmitoleic acid. Also, stearic acid is less likely to be incorporated into cholesterol esters. In epidemiologic and clinical studies, stearic acid was found to be associated with lowered LDL cholesterol in comparison with other saturated fatty acids.

=== Examples ===
Salts

- Potassium stearate
- Calcium stearate
- Cobaltous stearate
- Lithium stearate
- Magnesium stearate
- Mercuric stearate
- Sodium stearate
- Zinc stearate

Esters

- Estradiol stearate
- Glycol stearate
- Stearin
- Testosterone stearate
