= Metallic soap =

Metallic salt of a fatty acid

A metallic soap is a metallic salt of a fatty acid. Theoretically, soaps can be made of any metal, although not all enjoy practical uses. Varying the metal can strongly affect the properties of the compound, particularly its solubility.

== Alkali, alkaline earth soaps ==
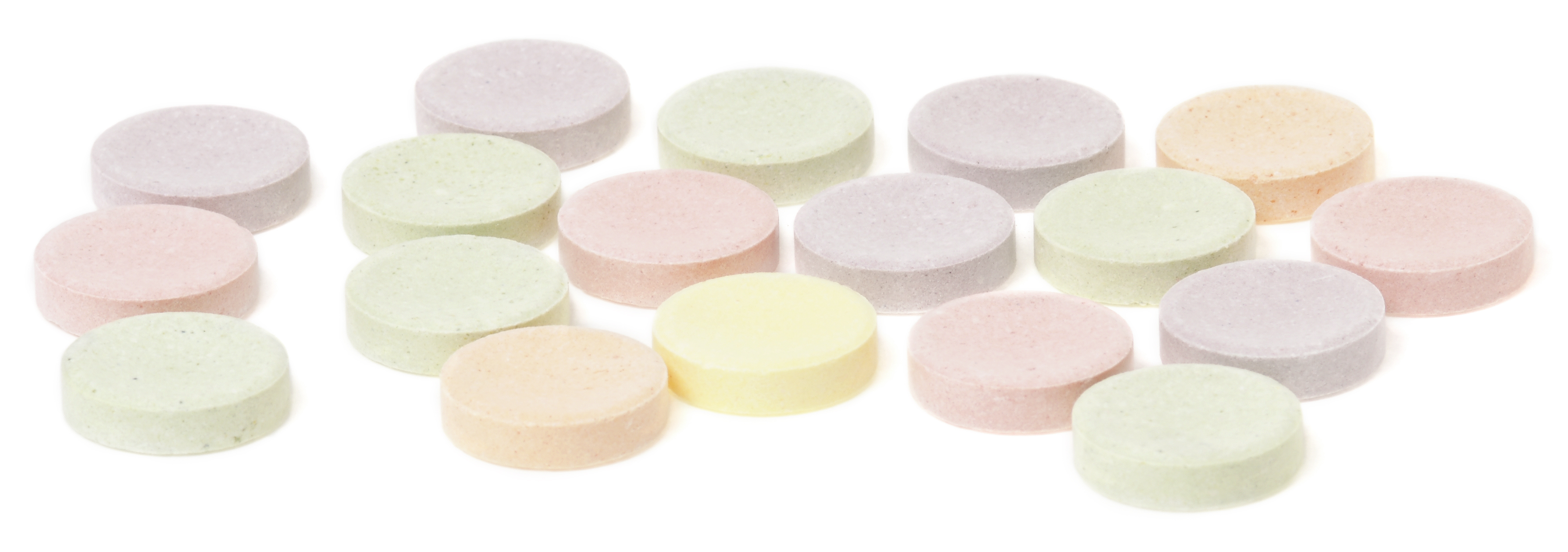
US Smarties, like many candies, contain calcium stearate, a metallic soap.

Alkali metal and alkaline earth soaps are white solids. The most commonly encountered are traditional household soaps, which are the fatty acid salts of sodium (hard soap) and potassium (soft soap). Lithium soap or greases, such as lithium stearate, are insoluble in water, and find use in lubricating grease.

Calcium and magnesium soaps are most commonly encountered as soap scum but the pure materials have a variety of uses. Magnesium stearate and calcium stearate are used as excipients, lubricants, release agents, and food additives, with the later use being covered by the generic E numbers of E470b and E470, respectively.

== Other metal soaps ==
Aluminium soaps are used as thickening agents in the production of cosmetics. Other examples include mixed calcium/zinc soaps which are used as heat stabilizer for polyvinyl chloride. Soaps of iron, cobalt and manganese are used as drying agents in paints and varnishes, which work by promoting the oxidation and crosslinking of unsaturated oils.

== Paint ==
Over the course of years, oil-based paint will react with metals in paint pigment, in a chemical reaction called saponification, to create metallic soaps. This chemical degradation can cause painted surfaces to become pockmarked or separate from one another, creating a challenge for art conservation.
