= Metal-organic compound =

Metal-organic compounds (jargon: metalorganics, metallo-organics) are a class of chemical compounds that contain metals and organic ligands, but lacking direct metal–carbon bonds. Metal β-diketonates, metal alkoxides, metal dialkylamides, transition metal carboxylate complexes, metal acetylacetonates, and metal phosphine complexes are representative members of this class. Some of metal-organic compounds confer solubility in organic solvents or volatility. Compounds with these properties find applications in materials science for metal organic vapor deposition (MOCVD) or sol-gel processing. Precise definitions of metal-organic compound may vary, however the term may describe:

- Organometallic chemistry
- Metal coordination complexes of organic ligands.
