= Saroj =

Saroj is a given name and a surname. Notable people with the name include:

Given name:

- Saroj Raj Choudhury, Indian environmentalist, wildlife conservationist, writer
- Saroj Dey (1921–1997), Bengali film director
- Saroj Dubey (1938–2020), Indian politician
- Saroj Nalini Dutt MBE (1887–1925), Indian feminist and social reformer
- Saroj Dutta (1914–1971), Indian communist intellectual and poet
- Saroj Ghose (1935–2025), Indian science popularizer and museum maker
- Saroj Chooramani Gopal, is an Indian medical doctor, medical educationist, paediatric surgeon
- Saroj Khan (1948–2020), one of the most prominent Indian dance choreographers in Hindi cinema
- Saroj Khaparde, Indian politician from Maharashtra
- Saroj Mukherjee (1911–1990), Indian freedom fighter, member of the Polit Bureau of the Communist Party of India
- Gogi Saroj Pal (born 1945), eminent Indian artist
- Saroj Pandey (born 1968), politician and member of Bharatiya Janata Party
- Saroj Perera (born 1960), Sri Lankan businessman, managing director of DSL Group of Companies

Surname:

- Daroga Prasad Saroj (born 1956), Indian politician for the Lalganj (Lok Sabha Constituency) in Uttar Pradesh
- Kalpana Saroj, female Indian entrepreneur
- Santosh Saroj, Bollywood screenwriter and dialogue writer
- Sarju Prasad Saroj, Indian politician belonging to the Janata Dal
- Shiv Kumar Saroj, announcer with the Hindi Service of Radio Ceylon
- Sushila Saroj, member of the 15th Lok Sabha of India
- Tufani Saroj (born 1956), Indian politician for the Saidpur (Lok Sabha constituency) in Uttar Pradesh
- Vinod Saroj (Born 1 July 1980) is an Indian politician from Bela Pratapgarh, India

== See also ==
- Padmasree Bharat Dr. Saroj Kumar, a 2012 Malayalam satirical film
- Saroj Mohan Institute of Technology (commonly SMIT), engineering college in Guptipara, West Bengal, India
- Saroja (disambiguation)
- Sarojini
- Sarooj
