= Mudgirls =

Canadian non-profit collective of female natural builders

Mudgirls working on a cob structure with a cedar shake roof on Cortes Island, British Columbia, Canada

Mudgirls are a not-for-profit collective of female natural builders founded in 2005 and based throughout Vancouver, the Sunshine Coast, Vancouver Island and the Gulf Islands of British Columbia, Canada. They build a variety of freestanding structures and additions for each other, as well as helping others build their own, and sharing natural building skills through affordable workshops.

== Principles ==
In 2018, the collective published a manifesto detailing their principles and practices.

Mudgirls promote the use of natural, local, and recycled materials, and are committed to the principles of sustainable development espoused by the permaculture movement.

Although they often collaborate with male craftspeople and welcome men as clients and workshops are open to participants of any gender, the Mudgirls are an all women's collective. Part of their mandate is to empower women with employment and the skills in the traditionally male-dominated field of construction. This associates them with the feminism and ecofeminism movements. Free childcare is provided at all Mudgirls events to encourage mothers to participate.

Mudgirls promote non-capitalist business practices and economic accessibility.

Mudgirls have a non-hierarchical organization structure.

== Projects ==
Mudgirls have constructed a variety of freestanding structures, ranging from small cookie stands, ovens, and outhouses to multi-story homes. They have also done renovations and additions to pre-existing structures, such as roofs, floors and walls. Their work can be found throughout the south-west coast of Canada, particularly Vancouver Island and the Gulf Islands.

== Materials ==
Mudgirls specialize in using cob, as well as other natural material such as strawbale, driftwood, cordwood, earthen plasters and natural insulations, and recycled materials like window panes, car tires and glass bottles. Local materials are sourced whenever possible.
