= Jalaj =

Indian male given name

- Gender: male
- Language: Hindi

Origin
- Meaning: lotus
- Region of origin: India

Jalaj (Devanagari: जलज) is an Indian masculine given name that originates from Sanskrit language. The Sanskrit word jalaja (a compound of jala 'water' and ja 'born') means 'produced or born or living or growing in water, coming from or peculiar to water' and can refer, among other things, to the lotus.. Other given names with the same meaning are Pankaj, Neeraj and Saroj.

== Notable people ==
- Jai Kumar Jalaj (born 1932), prominent figure in Hindi Literature.
- Jalaj Saxena (born 1986), Indian cricketer.
