= Museum of the Poet Al Oqaili =

Coordinates: 25°16′04″N 55°17′47″E

- Established: 1923
- Location: Dubai, United Arab Emirates
- Type: Historical museum

The Museum of the Poet Al Oqaili is a museum located in Dubai, United Arab Emirates dedicated to the Saudi-born poet Mubarak bin Hamad bin Mubarak Al Manea Al Oqaili. The museum is the former residence of Al Oqaili and was built in 1923 on the edge of the Spice Souq, and he lived in it after he moved from Saudi Arabia to the UAE. The museum displays the poet's original manuscripts, personal belongings (such as his desk, gun, and pen), documents, and his original wills.

== Building ==
Al Oqali brought a group of builders from the region of Al Ahsa in the east of the Arabian Peninsula to build this house. The house has two floors and a space of over 187 square meters. It was built from coral, stone, plaster, sandalwood, teakwood, fronds, trunks of palm trees, and the building material sarooj.

== About the museum ==
The museum displays Al Oqaiili's poetry, documents and will, furniture, and household items which represent the last quarter of the 19th century till the first half of the 20th century. Some of the work displayed is in the poet's handwriting.

The museum contains nine main wings, which are:

- Al Oqaili Life
- Al Oqaili’s Eloquent Poetry
- Al Oqaili’s Nabatean Poetry
- Al Oqaili’s Correspondence
- Al Oqaili’s Cultural and Social Life
- Al Oqaili’s Manuscripts
- Al Oqaili’s Majlis
- Al Oqaili’s House Restoration
- Writings about Al Oqaili

== About the poet ==
He is a poet of Saudi origin; he was born in Al-Ahsa in the Ottoman Sanjak of Najd, where he grew up and studied. He was then imprisoned for three years and was forced to leave after that. He moved between Iraq, the Sultanate of Oman, and Bahrain. In the end, he finally settled in the Emirate of Dubai in the United Arab Emirates in 1897, where he contacted its scholars and excelled in classical and popular poetry, where he composed classical poetry as well as colloquial poetry.
