= Lime plaster =

Type of plaster composed of sand, water, and lime

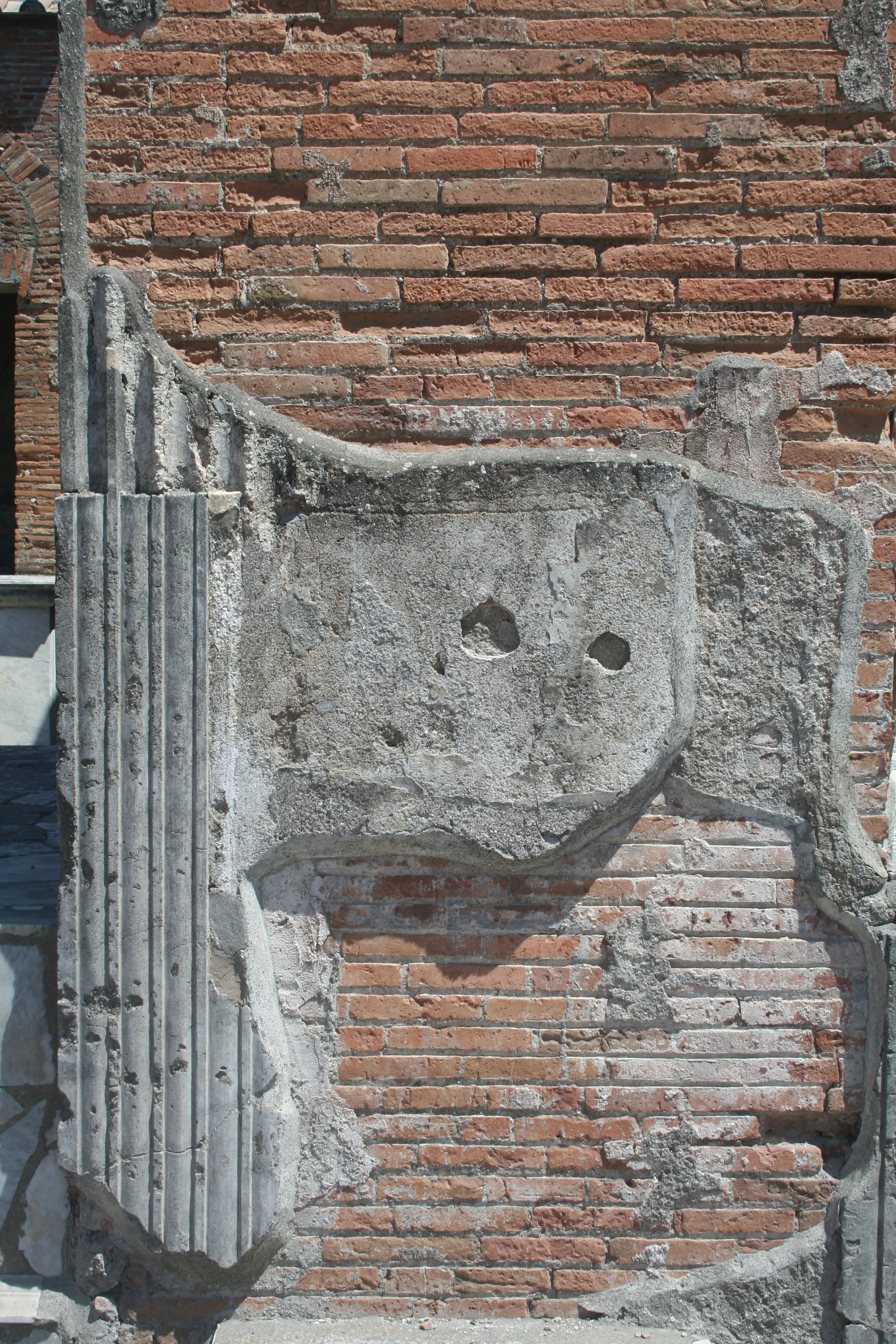
Limestone-plastered wall discovered in Pompei

Lime plaster is a type of plaster composed of sand, water, and lime, usually non-hydraulic hydrated lime (also known as slaked lime, high calcium lime or air lime). Ancient lime plaster often contained horse hair for reinforcement and pozzolan additives to reduce the working time.

Traditional non-hydraulic hydrated lime only sets through carbonatation when the plaster is kept moist and access of CO_{2} from the air is possible. It will not set when submersed in water. When a very thick layer or several layers are applied, the lime can remain soft for weeks.

The curing time of lime plaster can be shortened by using (natural) hydraulic lime or adding pozzolan additives, transforming it into artificially hydraulic lime. In ancient times, Roman lime plaster incorporated pozzolanic volcanic ash; in modern times, fly ash is preferred. Non-hydraulic lime plaster can also be made to set faster by adding gypsum.

Lime production for use in plastering home-made cisterns (in making them impermeable) was especially important in countries where rain-fall was scarce in summer. This enabled them to collect the winter run-off of rain water and to have it stored for later use, whether for personal or agricultural needs.

The word chunam (from Tamil chŭṇṇam), used in India and Hong Kong for a type of plaster made from lime and sand for indoor finishing and slope protection, has found its way into English.

== Advantages ==
Lime plaster sets up to a solid mass that is durable yet flexible. Hydraulic lime plaster is not as hard as cement plaster. Hydraulic limes and historic limes were graded as feeble, moderate and eminent. Modern hydraulic limes would be graded at 2, 3.5, or 5 newtons. Portland cement plaster on the other hand would typically be in the region of 25 to 35 newtons when cured; i.e. up to 10 times harder. Lime plaster is less affected by water and will not soften or dissolve like drywall and earthen or gypsum plaster. Unlike gypsum or clay plaster, lime plaster is sufficiently durable and resistant to the elements to be used for exterior plastering.

Compared to cement plaster, plaster made from hydrated lime is less brittle and less prone to cracking, requiring no expansion joints. It will not detach from the wall when subjected to shear stress due to expansion inflicted by solar radiation and moisture. Unlike cement plaster, it will shield softer materials from shear stresses. This would otherwise possibly cause the deterioration of the underlying surface. It is usually not recommended to replace more than 20% of the lime content with cement when rendering the facade, and it is a matter of contention whether adding any concrete is ever appropriate in order to maintain the benefits of lime over concrete.

Lime plaster is permeable and allows for the diffusion and evaporation of moisture. However, when properly worked with pozzolanic agents and animal fat, it becomes impermeable.

The elevated pH of the lime in the plaster acts as a fungicide, preventing mold from growing in lime plaster.

== Disadvantages ==
Non-hydraulic lime plaster sets slowly and is quite caustic while wet, with a pH of 12. Plasterers must take care to protect themselves or use mild acids as vinegar or lemon juice to neutralize chemical burn. When the plaster is dry, the pH falls to about 8.6. Non-hydraulic lime plaster requires moisture to set and has to be prevented from drying for several days. The number of qualified tradesmen capable of plastering with lime has declined due to industrialization, deskilling of trade crafts, and widespread adoption of drywall and gypsum veneer plaster.

== Venetian plaster techniques ==
Venetian plaster is a type of polished plaster that is widely used for wall and ceiling finishes. It consists of a mixture of plaster and marble dust, which is applied in thin layers using a spatula or trowel. The technique involves applying multiple layers of the plaster mixture and then burnishing the surface to create a smooth finish with the illusion of depth and texture.

There are various techniques that can be used to achieve different effects with Venetian plaster. Marmorino is one such technique, which involves adding marble dust to the plaster mixture to create a polished marble-like appearance. Scagliola is another technique that imitates various types of stone, while sgraffito involves scratching the surface of the plaster to reveal different layers and create decorative patterns.

When left un-burnished, Venetian plaster has a rough and stone-like matte finish. However, when applied correctly and burnished, it can result in a highly polished, rock-hard finish that resembles marble. This makes Venetian plaster an excellent alternative to expensive and heavy marble installations, as it can be used on surfaces such as columns, corbels, and curved walls.

== Venetian plaster history ==
The history of polished plaster can be traced back to ancient times, with evidence of its use in ancient Egyptian, Roman, and Greek architecture. The technique was highly valued for its durability and aesthetic appeal, and it has continued to be used and refined throughout history.

Throughout ancient times, lime was a widely employed material for constructing plaster on both interior and exterior walls. The Greeks, in particular, made a remarkable discovery regarding the production of a special adhesive by subjecting limestone rocks to intense heat within expansive ovens. Nevertheless, this transformative process, which involved converting limestone into calcium oxide, carbon dioxide, and steam, posed significant challenges due to the requirement of extremely high temperatures, reaching approximately 2,200 °F (1,200 °C). The resulting substance, known as quicklime or lump-lime, was subsequently pulverized into a fine powder and combined with water in a process called "slaking". Through this procedure, a fundamental binding agent called "lime putty" was created and utilized for plastering purposes. The slaked lime, a dense and moist substance, would then be stored in a designated pit for several months, or even years, to ensure complete hydration. Historical accounts suggest that the Romans enforced a regulation stipulating that slaked lime could only be employed if it had aged for a minimum of three years.

Venetian plaster, a distinctive type of wall covering, boasts a rich historical legacy that traces back to ancient times, with its origins linked to Pompeii and the subsequent Roman Empire. Vitruvius, who lived around 80–70 BC, documented the process of manufacturing lime plaster in his renowned work "De architecture" or "Ten Books of Architecture". These methods were further elaborated upon by Pliny the Elder in his book Natural History, dating back approximately 2,000 years. The Romans referred to the finished product as "Marmoratum Opus", meaning "smooth marble". The rediscovery of Venetian plaster can be attributed to the Renaissance period, characterized by a renewed interest in the ancient techniques of Rome. Palladio, a renowned Renaissance architect, referred to the process as "Pietra d'Istria" since the plaster bore a striking resemblance to natural rocks such as marble, granite, and travertine commonly found near Venice. Palladio's architectural creations, although seemingly constructed from stone, were in fact composed of brick and stucco. The plastering process involved the initial application of a coarse layer of plaster known as "arricio", followed by subsequent layers of lime putty blended with powdered marble to achieve a smooth and polished surface. On occasion, pigments were added to the wet plaster to introduce vibrant hues.

During the Baroque period, Venetian plaster experienced a decline in popularity, echoing the diminished prominence witnessed after the fall of the Roman Empire. However, in the 1950s, a notable Venetian builder named Carlo Scarpa played a pivotal role in revitalizing the use of Marmorino in contemporary construction. Scarpa not only adhered to the methods outlined by Vitruvius and Palladio but also introduced innovative techniques involving the utilization of animal hides and acrylic resins.

== Historical use in the arts ==
One of the earliest examples of lime plaster dates back to the end of the eighth millennium BC. Three statues were discovered in a buried pit at 'Ain Ghazal in Jordan that were sculpted with lime plaster over armatures of reeds and twine. They were made in the pre-pottery neolithic period, around 7200 BC. The fact that these sculptures have lasted so long is a testament to the durability of lime plaster.

== Historical uses in building ==
- Lime plaster was a common multi-purpose material used throughout the PPNB Levant, Iran and Anatolia, including Jericho, 'Ain Ghazal, Çatalhöyük and Çayönü. It was used for internal walls, floors and internal platforms. At the archaeological site of 'Ain Ghazal in modern-day Jordan, occupied from 7200 BC to 5000 BC, lime plaster is believed to have been used as the main component of the large anthropomorphical figurines discovered there in the 1980s.
- Qadad lime plaster is waterproof and used for interiors and exteriors
- Some of the earliest known examples of lime used for building purposes are in ancient Egyptian buildings (primarily monuments). Some of these edifices are found in the chambers of the pyramids, and date to between the Ninth and Tenth Dynasties (~2000 BC). They are still hard and intact.
- Archaeological digs carried out on the island of Malta have shown that in places like Tarxien and Hagar, lime stucco was also used as a binder to hold stone together as well as for decoration at sites dating back as far as 3000–2500 BC.
- At el-Amarna, a large pavement on brick was discovered that dates back to 1400 BC. It was apparently the floor of part of the harem of King Amenhotep IV.
- Ancient Chinese used Suk-wui (the Chinese word for slaked lime) in the construction of The Great Wall of China.
- Ancient Romans used hydraulic lime (added volcanic ash, an activated aluminium silicate) to ensure hardening of plaster and concrete in cold or wet conditions.
- The Aztec Empire and other Mesoamerican civilizations used lime plaster to pave streets in their cities. It was also used to coat the walls and floors of buildings.
- This material was used in the San Luis Mission architecture.

== See also ==
- 'Ain Ghazal
- Faux Finishing
- Fresco, a method of painting on fresh plaster
- Gypsum
- Lime (material)
- Lime mortar
- Limepit
- Limestone
- Plaster
- Plaster of Paris
- Plasterwork
- Qadad, a waterproofing method for lime plaster
- Tadelakt, a waterproofing method for lime plaster
- Sarooj
- Whitewash
