= Limepit =

Old method of calcining limestone

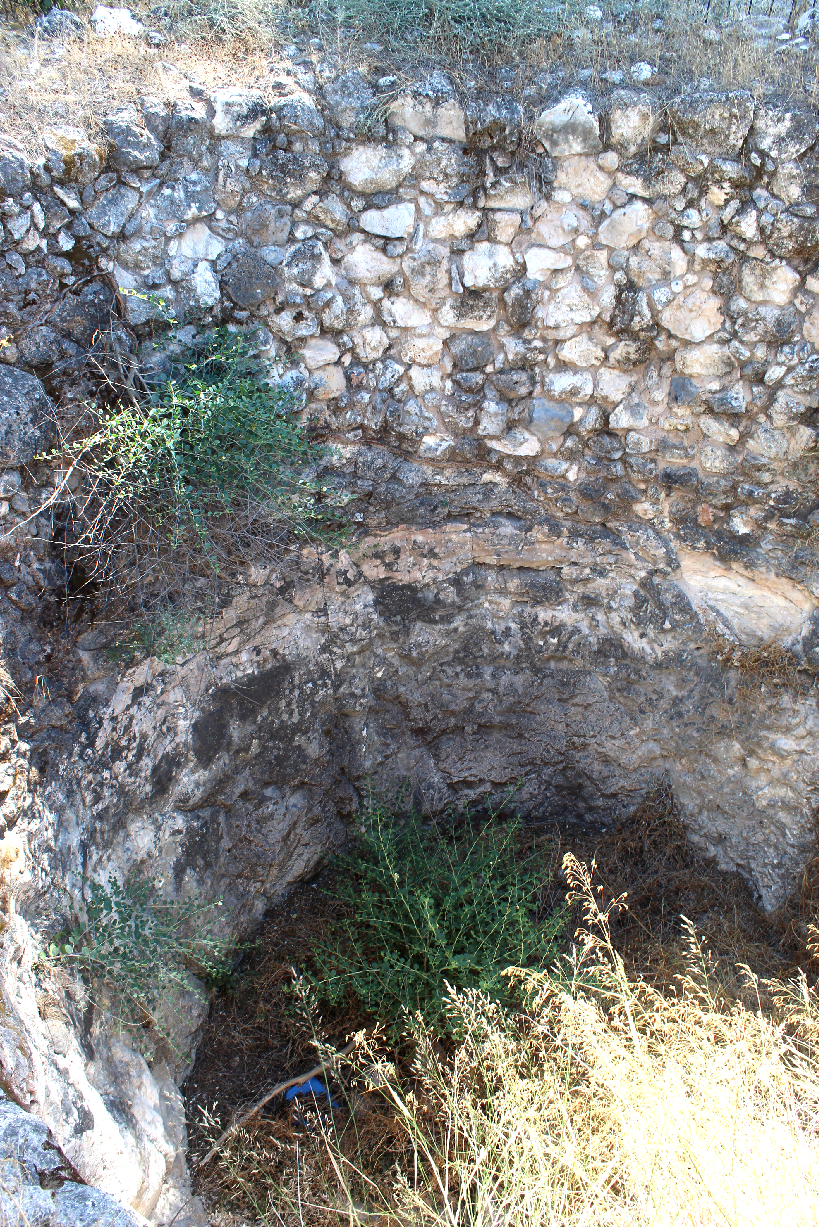
Lime pit in Judaea

A limepit is either a place where limestone is quarried, or a man-made pit used to burn lime stones in the same way that modern-day kilns and furnaces constructed of brick are now used above ground for the calcination of limestone (calcium carbonate, CaCO_{3}) and by which quicklime (calcium oxide, CaO) is produced, an essential component in waterproofing and in wall plastering (plaster skim).

== Primitive limepits ==
The production of lime in the Land of Israel has been dated as far back as the Canaanite period, and has continued in successive generations ever since. The man-made limepit was usually dug in ground near the place where limestone could be quarried. Remnants of old limepits have been unearthed in archaeological digs all throughout the Levant. In a country where hundreds of such limepits or limekilns for burning limestone were found, the Israel Antiquities Authority (IAA) describes dozens of them (Hebrew: בור סיד / כבשן סיד), one discovered in Kiryat Ye'arim, another in Har Giora - East (2 km. north of Bar-Giora), as well as in Neve Yaakov, among other places. Two lime kilns, stratigraphically dated to the late Hellenistic period were excavated at Ramat Rachel, the latter of which being circular in shape (3.6 metres in diameter) and built into the ruins of a large pool, using earlier walls. A rounded kiln (2.5–2.8 metres in diameter) was found northeast of Jerusalem dating back to the Iron Age (seventh–sixth century BCE), and was built of stones and had a rectangular unit adjacent to it. In the Lachish area, several lime kilns were excavated by a team on behalf of the IAA, and which kilns were partially hewn in the bedrock and partially built of fieldstones, and last used at some point between the mid-15th century and the mid-17th century CE.

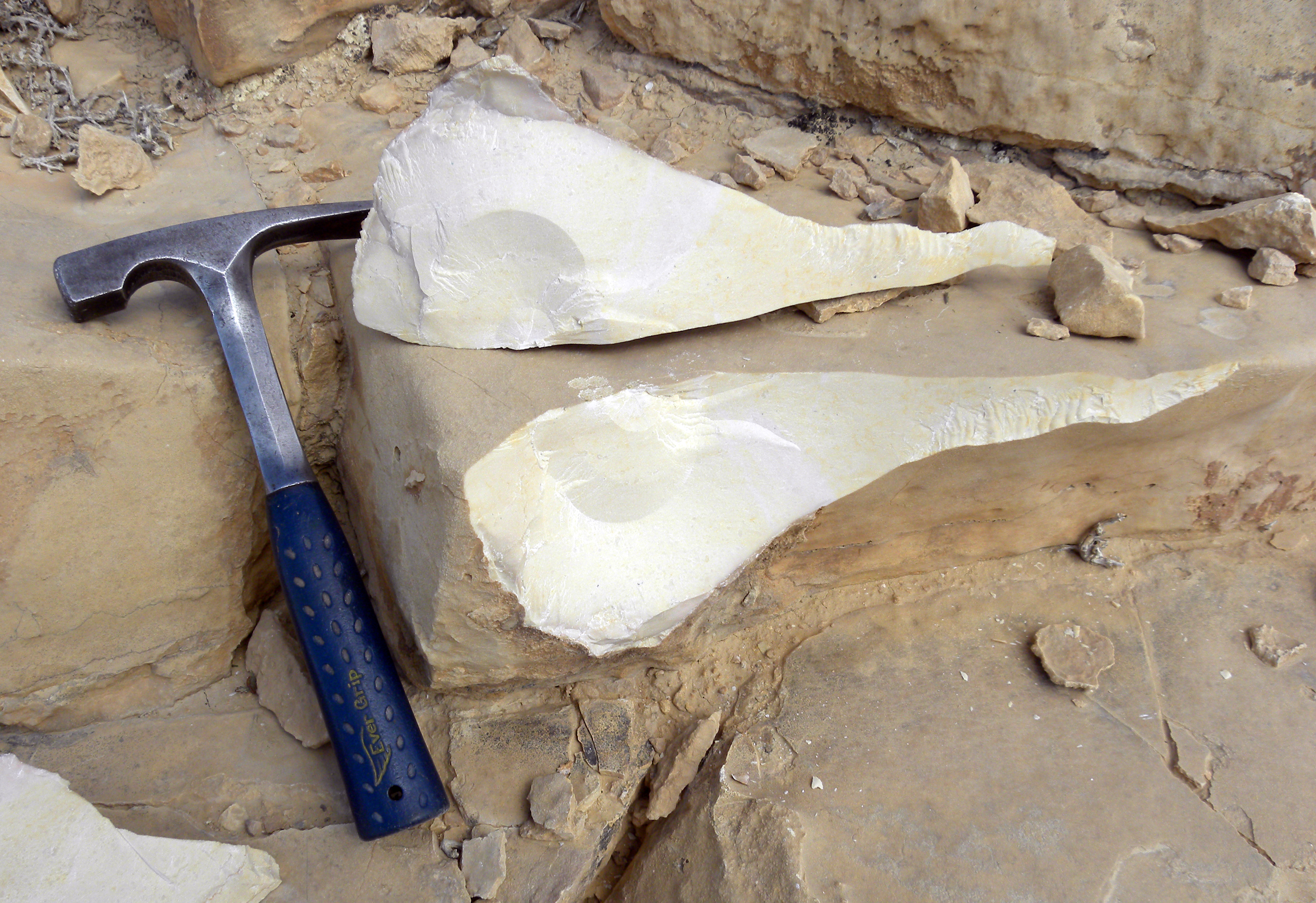
Raw limestone at quarry

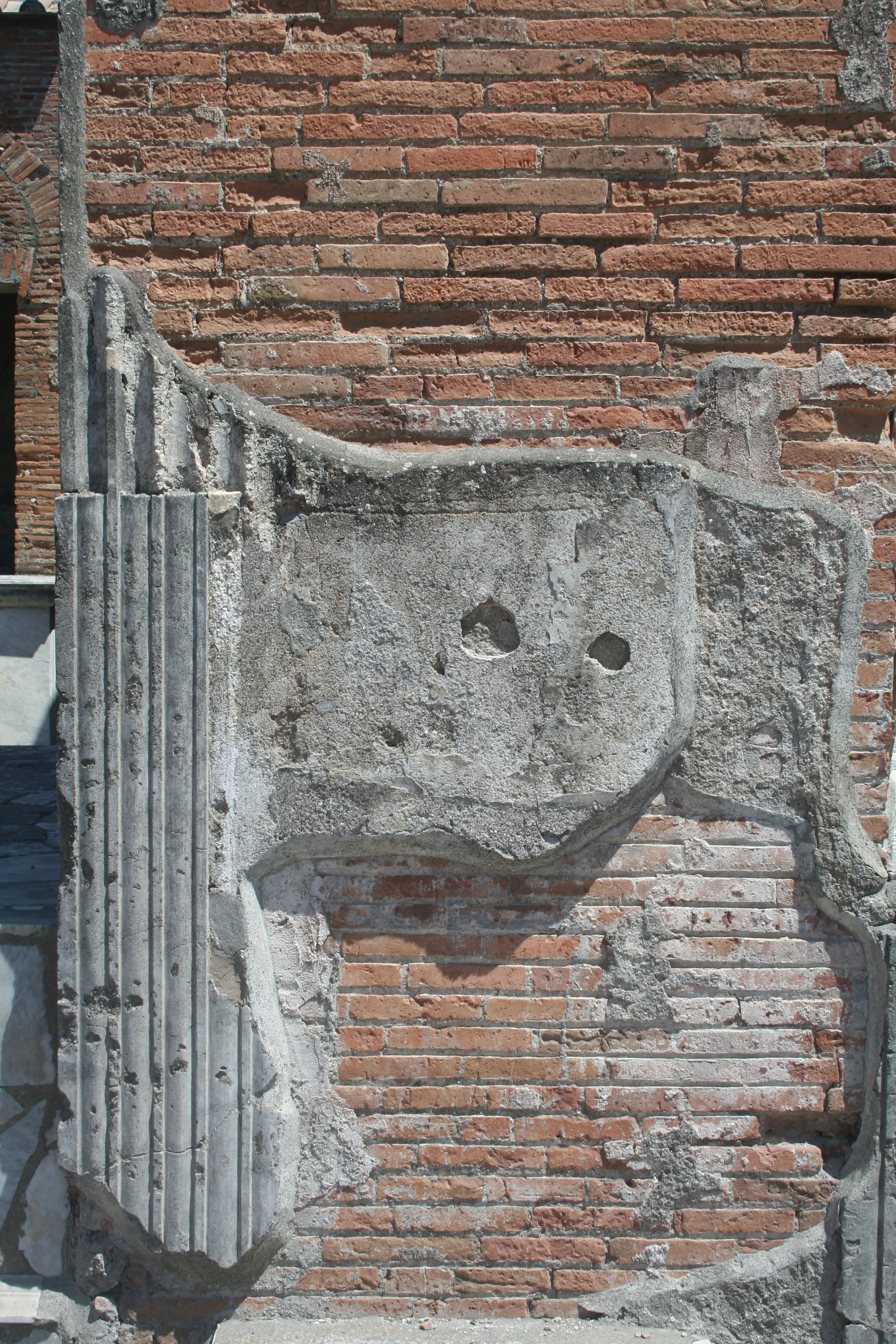
Limestone-plastered wall discovered in Pompei

In Bedouin-Arab culture in Israel, the limepit was dug to a depth of about 2.5 metres (8.2 ft) and about 3 metres (9.8 ft) in diameter. By all appearances, the pit was made after the same basic principle used in a "Dakota fire pit," which is made with an air inlet at the base, allowing for air-ventilation, but on a larger scale. Air intake was achieved by digging an adjacent channel which ran from a short distance into the limepit, or else an underground shaft (shafts) at floor level of limepit leading from an open area, allowing for a steady, free-flowing draught of air to be drawn into the limepit as it burns. In this way, there was no need for the use of bellows to reach a high temperature, but only to stoke the fire with wood continuously for several days for it to reach a temperature of 900° Celsius (1650° F). Its mode of operation was similar to that of a shaft kiln. After cooling, wood ashes that had accumulated were then separated from the burnt blocks of limestone. The limestone blocks were then crushed, afterwards slaked (the process of adding water and constantly turning the lime to create a chemical reaction, whereby the burnt lime, or what is known also as calcium oxide, is changed into calcium hydroxide), and mixed with an aggregate to form an adhesive paste (plaster) used in construction and for daubing buildings.

When properly burnt, limestone loses its carbonic acid (H_{2}CO_{3}) and becomes converted into caustic or quicklime (CaO). One-hundred parts of raw limestone yields about 56 parts of quicklime. In the West, quicklime was formerly a major component in common mortar, besides its predominant use in plastering. In some Middle-Eastern countries where rain-fall was scarce in the dry season, lime production for use in plastering home-made cisterns (in making them impermeable by adding thereto a pozzolanic agent) was especially important. This enabled them to collect the winter run-off of rain water and to have it stored for later use, whether for personal or agricultural needs. Lime is also an important component in the production of Nabulsi soap, in dyeing fabrics, and in use as a depilatory.

=== Basic design ===
Many limepits were sunken in the ground at a depth of between 2.5 and 5 meters and 3 to 4.5 meters in diameter, in a circular fashion, and some were built with a retaining wall along the inside for support, usually constructed of uncut field-stones. Simpler limepits were made without supportive walls. In the following account, Abu-Rabiʻa describes the practice of Bedouins in the Negev, during the late 19th and early 20th-century:

Lime is derived from chalk [sic] by burning. The Bedouins used it in plastering their cisterns. Burning chalk stone was performed in simple kilns in close proximity to where the chalk was found. Lime kilns were made by digging a round hole, three metres wide, two and a half metres deep. After the hole was dug, the chalk and fuel for a fire would be brought to it. Stones of chalk (limestone) would be arranged in a circular dome in the pit. The burning process would last three to six days, without letup. After the burning was finished, the kiln would be left to cool for four to six days. The lime would then be taken out. The large lime blocks along the edge of the pit were considered of the highest quality, while the small pieces towards the center of the pit were considered grade B. One camel load, or cantur (qentar / quntar = 100 ratels, or 250–300 kilograms), of lime would fetch 40 grush on the Jerusalem market in the early 1880s.

In Israel, the principal fuel used to keep the lime-kiln burning was the dried brushwood of prickly burnet (Sarcopoterium spinosum) and savory (Satureja thymbra), where often camel loads of this dried wood would be hauled to the lime-kiln. Monolithic stone structures were already in use for burning limestone (nāri) during the Ottoman period, throughout the Levant. Modern kilns for burning lime first appeared in Palestine during the British Mandate.

=== Chemical changes ===
The lime stones selected were those that had the least amount of impurities within them. Limepits were almost always built near the supply of limestone, and a sufficient pile of wood kindling was heaped in great store before the actual burning process began, a supply that was to last between 3 and 7 days of continual burning, both, by night and day. In the southern Mediterranean regions, one of the favorite wood sources was thorny burnet (Sarcopoterium spinosum). The fire was attended by men with long staves and pitchforks who pushed the burning material into the pit. Initially, a cloud of smoke billowed from the pit. After several days of burning, when the uppermost stone in the fire pit began to glow a fiery red, it signaled that the burning process of the lime was finished, and that the process of carbon dioxide emissions from the limestone has been completed, and that the lime was now ready for marketing as lime or powder. After being allowed to cool, the burnt limestone was extracted from the pit when it was light and brittle. During the burning process, the limestone loses about 50% of its original anatomical weight. The lime becomes ready for use only after water has been added.

== Gallery ==
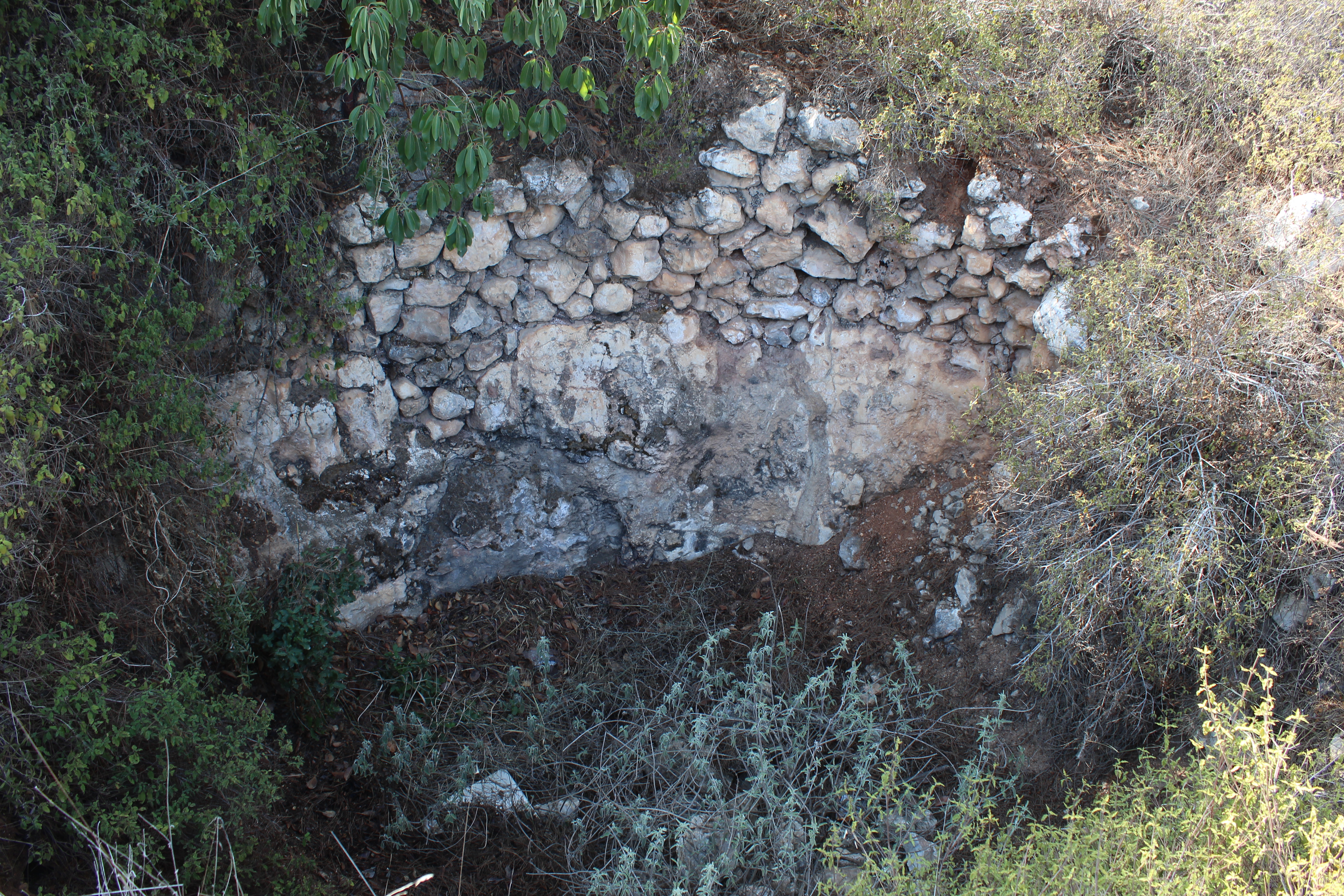
Limepit in the Jewish National Fund Forest, near Nes Harim

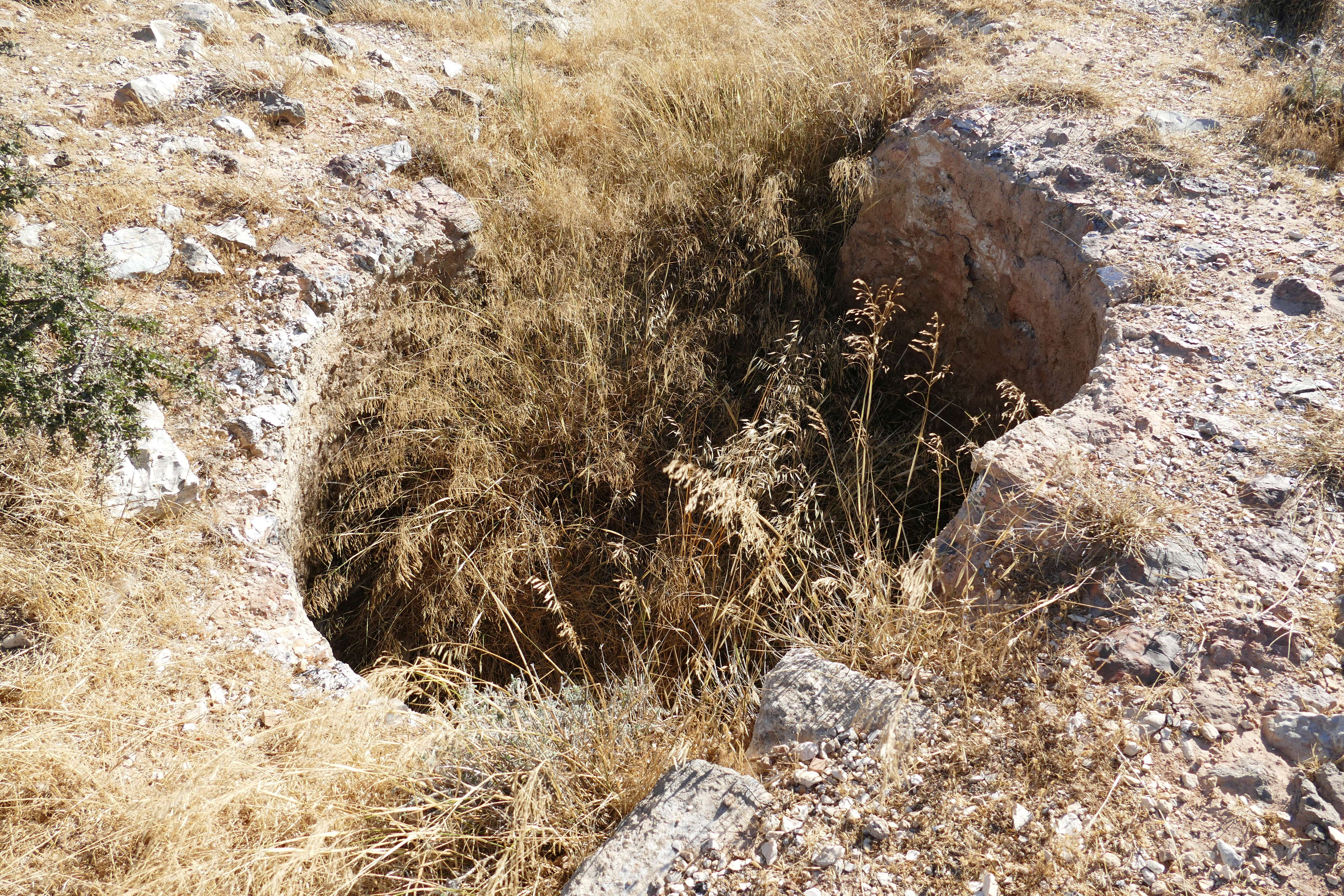
Ancient limepit in Jerusalem

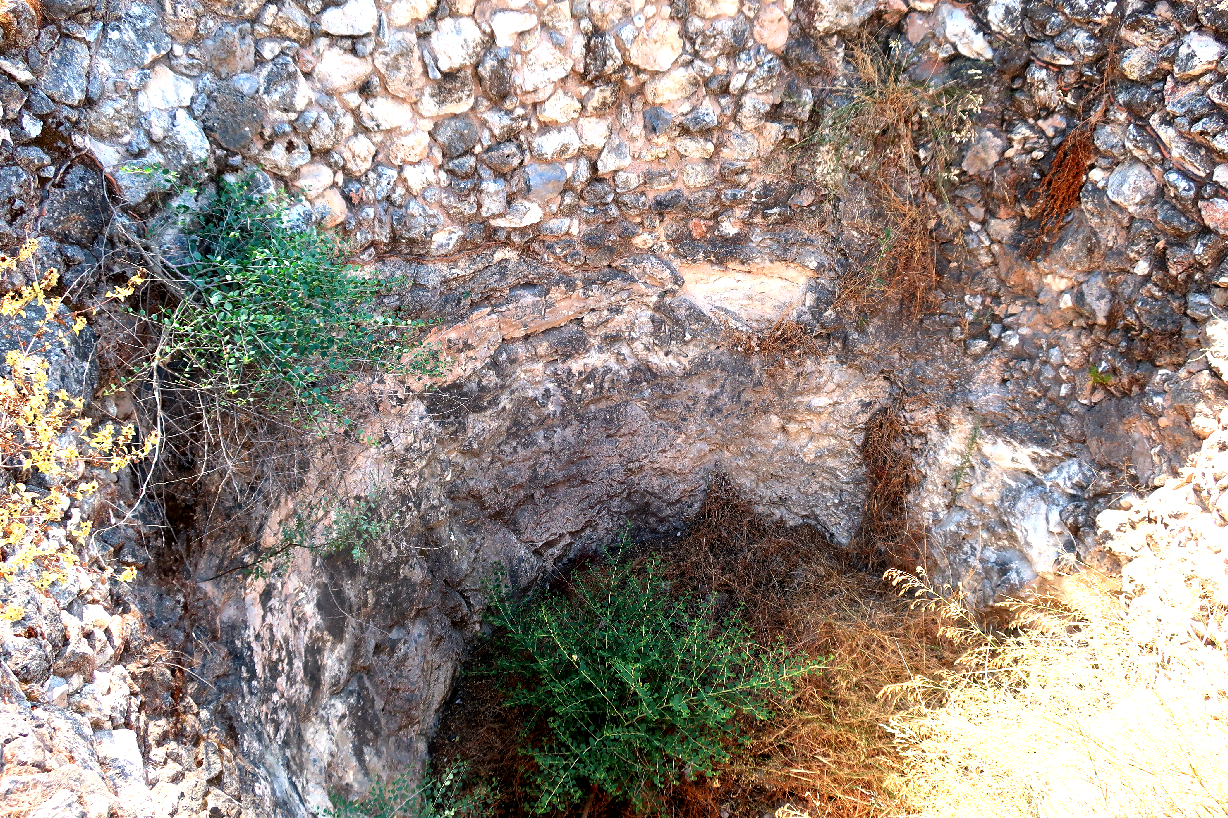
Lime kiln in Judaea, in the Angels Forest, Shahariyya, near Kiryat Gat

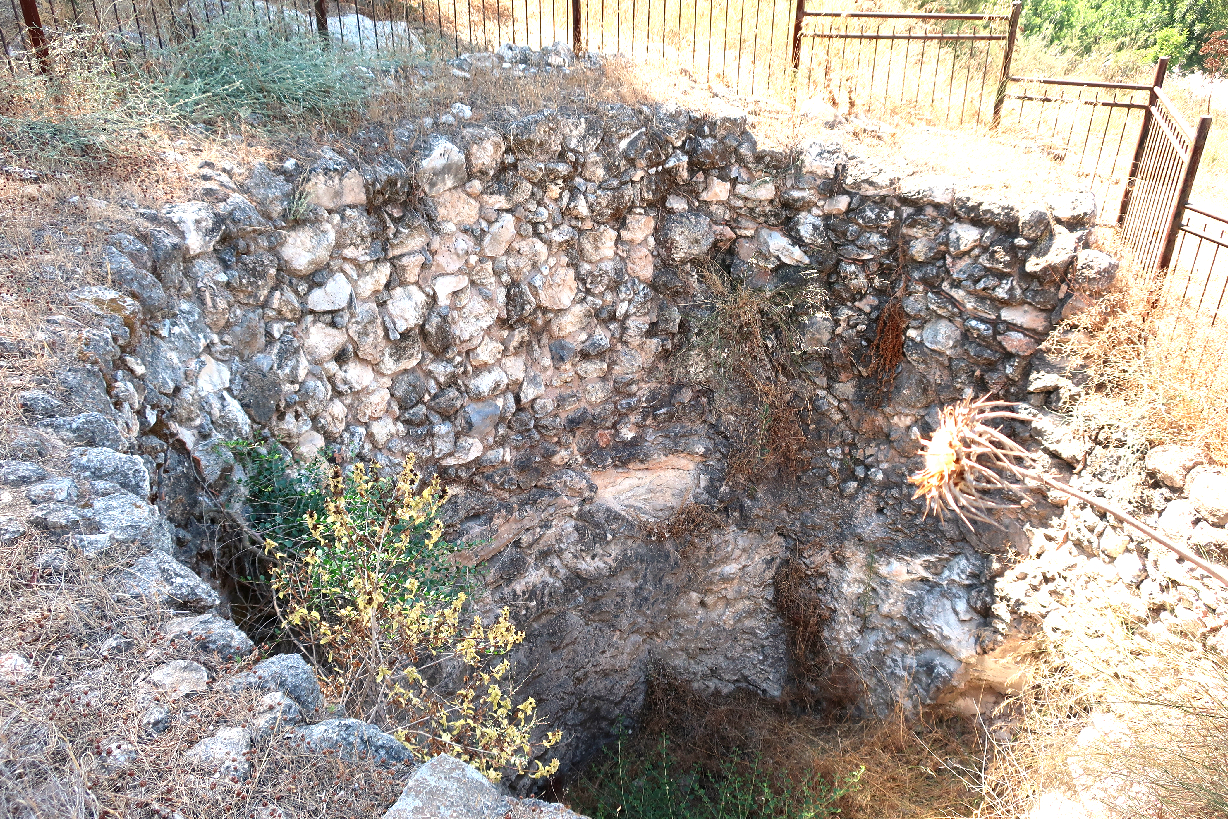
Lime pit in Judaea, the Angels Forest

== See also ==
- Lime kiln
- Lime plaster
- Qadad (Method of waterproofing cisterns in South Arabia)

== Bibliography ==
- Abu-Rabiʻa, ʻAref (2001). Bedouin Century: Education and Development among the Negev Tribes in the Twentieth Century. New York: Berghahn Books. doi:10.3167/9781571818324. ISBN 978-1-57181-832-4. OCLC 47119256.
- Be'eri, Ron (2012). "Neve Yaakov". Hadashot Arkheologiyot: Excavations and Surveys in Israel (in Hebrew). 124. Israel Antiquities Authority. JSTOR 26601314.
- Cohen, Amnon (1989). Economic Life in Ottoman Jerusalem. Cambridge: Cambridge University Press. ISBN 0521365511.
- Dalman, Gustaf (2013). Work and Customs in Palestine. Vol. I/2. Translated by Nadia Abdulhadi Sukhtian. Ramallah: Dar Al Nasher. ISBN 9789950385-01-6. OCLC 1040774903.
- Eliyahu-Behar, A.; Yahalom-Mack, N.; Ben-Shlomo, D. (2017). "Excavation and Analysis of an Early Iron Age Lime Kiln", Israel Exploration Journal 67, pp. 14–31
- Fraiberg, Alexander (2013). "Nahal Lakhish (The Lachish Valley)". Hadashot Arkheologiyot: Excavations and Surveys in Israel. 125. Israel Antiquities Authority. JSTOR 26602840.
- Mizrachi, Yonatan (2008). "Kiryat Ye'arim (Final Report)". Hadashot Arkheologiyot: Excavations and Surveys in Israel (in Hebrew). 120. Israel Antiquities Authority. JSTOR 26592581.
- Spanier, Yossi; Sasson, Avi (2001). Limekilns in the Land of Israel (כבשני סיד בארץ-ישראל) (in Hebrew). Ariel: Jerusalem: Land of Israel Museum. OCLC 48108956.
- Young, Clyde; Engel, Bernard, eds. (1943), Spons' Practical Builders' Pocket Book – A Reference Book of Memoranda, Tables and Official Rules and Regulations for Architects and Builders (8 ed.), London: E. & F.N. Spon, Ltd., OCLC 156000531
- Zilberbod, Irina (2006). "Har Giora (East)". Hadashot Arkheologiyot: Excavations and Surveys in Israel (in Hebrew). 118. Israel Antiquities Authority. JSTOR 26583841.
