= Selma Al-Radi =

Iraqi archaeologist

- سلمى الراضي
- Al-Radi in 2003
- Born: July 23, 1939; Iraq
- Died: October 7, 2010 (aged 71); Manhattan, US
- Spouse: Qais Al-Awqati

Selma Al-Radi (Arabic: سلمى الراضي) (July 23, 1939 – October 7, 2010) was an Iraqi archaeologist known for her twenty-year restoration of the Amiriya Madrasa, which is under consideration as a UNESCO World Heritage Site. She advocated for using local labour and traditional methods in restoration. Selma died of Ovarian cancer on October 7, 2010 in her home in Manhattan.

== Education and Career ==
=== Early life ===
Selma Al-Radi was born in Baghdad, Iraq, but her childhood was spent in Tehran, Iran and later in New Delhi, India where her father Muhammed Selim Al-Radi served the Iraqi Ambassador. It was the turmoil in India during the 1947 Partition which encouraged her to look to the past and become an archaeologist. Al-Radi had "decided early in life that I was not keen on modern things, partly because of all this turmoil and upheaval around us. The only tranquil phase for me was the past."

=== Education and Career ===
She obtained her BA at the University of Cambridge in Akkadian, Hebrew and Persian. Her tutor was Joan Oates, a noted Mesopotamian archaeologist. After graduation, she returned to Baghdad, where she began working in the National Museum of Iraq.

Along with her cousin Lamia Al-Gailani, they were the first women in Iraq to go on archaeological excavations as representatives of the archaeological service. One of her first assignments was to accompany the team led by David Oates, which discovered a large cache of the celebrated Nimrud Ivories, many of which were restored by Al-Radi, giving her a first taste of restoration. She then obtained her master's degree in Art History and Archeology at Columbia University in New York in 1967 under the tutelage of Edith Porada. On her return, she continued to work in the Department of Antiquities and the Museum. After her family left Iraq to settle in Beirut, Al-Radi began teaching at the American University of Beirut (1969–1974). She enrolled in the University of Amsterdam for her PhD degree. Her research was performed on a Bronze Age site in Cyprus, Phlamoudhi Vounari, and her thesis was published in 1983.

==== Restoration of Amiriya Madrasa ====
In 1977, Al-Radi took on the position of an adviser to the National Museum of Yemen in Sana'a for restoration and cataloguing. There, she conducted many archaeological surveys, participated in digs, energized the field of restoration of buildings especially mud brick palaces in the Hadhramawt. But her chef d'oeuvre was to be the restoration of the Amiriya Madrasa. Built in the 1504 and named after Sultan Amir Ibn Abid Al-Wahhab who commissioned the ornate building in southern Yemen, it was likely not used as a madrasa (school) rather, a palace with a mosque .

Beginning 1983, in collaboration with the Antiquites Department led by Qadi Ismail Al-Aqwa', she led the restoration of this building which was close to collapse. After securing support from the Dutch and Yemeni governments and a team of local craftsmen whose expertise was handed down in the same families for generations, Dr Radi insisted on only using materials and techniques the original structure had been built from - limestone and brick. Not only did these historical methods resuscitate the medieval craft of building in Yemen, it kept the cost of the restoration to around $2million. In particular, she utilised the ancient Yemeni plastering method of qudad, a waterproofing cement. After laborious experimentation, they discovered the correct mixtures of volcanic ash and slaked lime. The results were published in 1995. The large cadre of masons and qudad workers became a school of restoration after the project gained international attention. Many of the workers were hired to restore old mansions in Yemen or to use the same methods to build new ones there.

Once the main structure was stabilized, she turned her attention to the adjacent mosque. The building was painted with murals in colorful designs, part of a long tradition of painted wooden and plaster ceilings in Yemen from the early medieval period. Al-Radi had documented the existence of as many as 40 of these painted mosques, a unique feature in Islamic architecture, and Yemen was particularly rich in these structures. A project began with the Centro di Conservazione Archaeologica in Rome led by Roberto Nardi to conserve and restore the paintings. Since there was no continued tradition of painting restoration within the local craftsmen, they were trained by a team of Italian art restorers. Al-Radi herself cleaned the whitewash from the intricately carved stucco decoration using fine dental and surgical tools, an enterprise which took 15 years. She published a book following this project with emphasis on restoration of the stucco and paintings. The New York Times described the project as "an immense undertaking" and the madrasa as "one of the great treasures of Islamic art and architecture." Full restorations ceased in 2004 when the complex was opened to the public and used as a mosque.

== Awards and Publications ==
In 2005 Al-Radi received the Yemen Presidential Medal of Culture. In 2007, Al-Radi and Yahya Al-Nasiri received the Aga Khan Award for Architecture for their monumantal work in the restoration spanning three decades.

She also published two books on her restoration work:

- “The Amiriya in Rada: The History and Restoration of a Sixteenth-Century Madrasa in Yemen” (Oxford University, 1997; edited by Robert Hillenbrand)
- “Amiriya Madrasa: The Conservation of the Mural Paintings” (Centro di Conservazione Archeologica, 2005; with Roberto Nardi and Chiara Zizola).

== Family ==
Al-Radi was the sister of Nuha al-Radi, the author of Baghdad Diaries. Al-Radi was married to Qais Al-Awqati, a Professor of Medicine and Physiology at Columbia University. Her son Rakan Ammar Zahawi from her first marriage is an environmental scientist who is the head of the Las Cruces Biological Station in Costa Rica.
