= Saroja =

Saroja may refer to:

- Sarojahöhe, or Saroja, a mountain on the border of Liechtenstein and Austria in the Eastern Alps
- Saroja (2000 film), a 2000 Sri Lankan film
- Saroja (2008 film), a 2008 Indian Tamil-language comedy thriller film
- B. Saroja Devi, South Indian film actress
- E. V. Saroja, South Indian actress and dancer
- R. Saroja, Indian politician and former Member of the Legislative Assembly of Tamil Nadu
- V. Saroja, Indian politician and former Member of Parliament from Tamil Nadu
- Saroja Kumari Jhuthu, Indian shooter

== See also ==
- Seroja (disambiguation)
