= Calcium stearate =

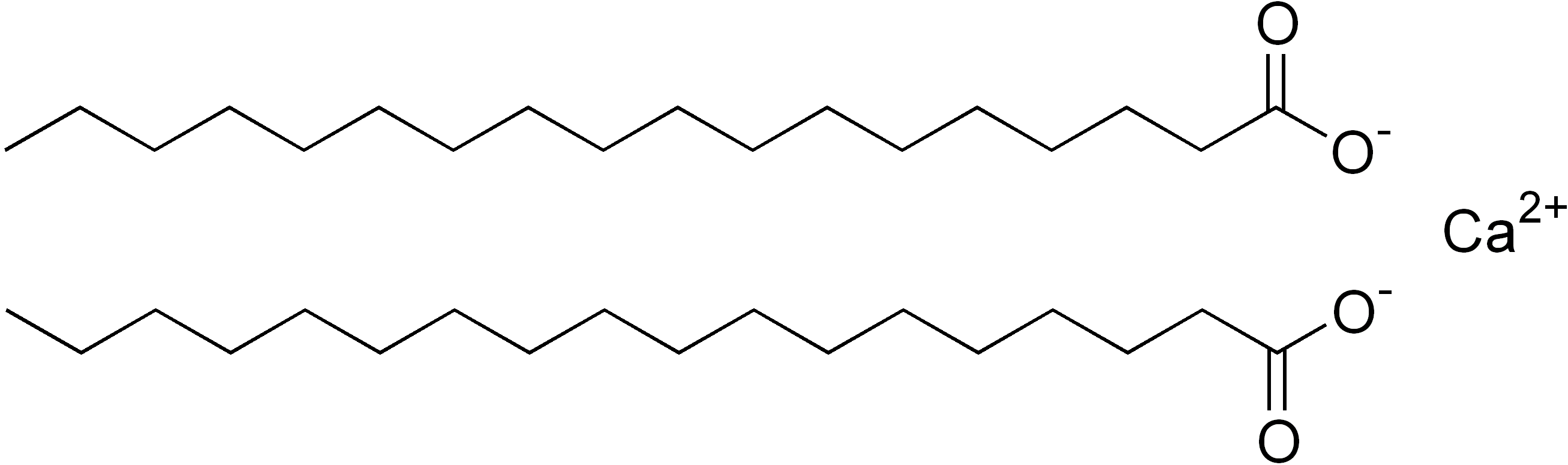

Names
- Preferred IUPAC name Calcium di(octadecanoate)
- Other names E470

Identifiers
CAS Number	1592-23-0
3D model (JSmol)	Interactive image
ChEBI	CHEBI:190296
ChEMBL	ChEMBL2106092
ChemSpider	14587
ECHA InfoCard	100.014.976
PubChem CID	15324
UNII	776XM7047L
CompTox Dashboard (EPA)	DTXSID7027419
- InChI: InChI=1S/2C18H36O2.Ca/c2*1-2-3-4-5-6-7-8-9-10-11-12-13-14-15-16-17-18(19)20;/h2*2-17H2,1H3,(H,19,20);/q;;+2/p-2 Key: CJZGTCYPCWQAJB-UHFFFAOYSA-L; InChI=1/2C18H36O2.Ca/c2*1-2-3-4-5-6-7-8-9-10-11-12-13-14-15-16-17-18(19)20;/h2*2-17H2,1H3,(H,19,20);/q;;+2/p-2 Key: CJZGTCYPCWQAJB-NUQVWONBAL
- SMILES: [Ca+2].[O-]C(=O)CCCCCCCCCCCCCCCCC.[O-]C(=O)CCCCCCCCCCCCCCCCC

Properties
Chemical formula	Ca(C_{18}H_{35}O_{2})_{2}
Molar mass	607.030 g·mol^{−1}
Appearance	white to yellowish-white powder
Density	1.08 g/cm^{3}
Melting point	180 °C (356 °F; 453 K)
Solubility in water	0.004 g/100 mL (15 °C (59 °F))
Solubility	soluble in hot pyridine; slightly soluble in oil

Hazards
- GHS labelling
Signal word	Warning
NFPA 704 (fire diamond)	0 1 0
Autoignition temperature	250 °C (482 °F; 523 K)
Threshold limit value (TLV)	3 mg/m^{3} (TWA)
- Except where otherwise noted, data are given for materials in their standard state (at 25 °C [77 °F], 100 kPa). verify (what is ?) Infobox references

Calcium stearate is a carboxylate salt of calcium, classified as a calcium soap. The salt is a component of some lubricants, surfactants, as well as many foodstuffs. It is a white waxy powder.

== Production and occurrence ==
Calcium stearate is produced by heating stearic acid and calcium oxide:

2 C_{17}H_{35}COOH + CaO → Ca(C_{18}H_{35}O_{2})_{2} + H_{2}O

It is also the main component of soap scum, a white solid that forms when soap is mixed with hard water. Unlike soaps containing sodium and potassium, calcium stearate is insoluble in water and does not lather well. Commercially it is sold as a 50% dispersion in water or as a spray-dried powder. As a food additive, it is known by the generic E number E470a (sodium, potassium and calcium salts of fatty acids).

== Applications ==
Calcium stearate is a waxy material with low solubility in water, unlike traditional sodium and potassium soaps. It is also easy and cheap to produce, and exhibits low toxicity. These attributes are the basis of many of its applications. Related applications exist for the magnesium stearate.

- Calcium stearate is used as a flow agent and surface conditioner in some candies such as Smarties, jawbreakers and Sprees.
- It is a waterproofing agent for fabrics.
- A lubricant in pencils and crayons.
- A lubricant in the dry drawing method of wire production.
- The concrete industry uses calcium stearate for efflorescence control of cementitious products used in the production of concrete masonry units i.e. paver and block, as well as waterproofing.
- In paper production, calcium stearate is used as a lubricant to provide good gloss, preventing dusting and fold cracking in paper and paperboard making.
- In plastics, it can act as an acid scavenger or neutralizer at concentrations up to 1000ppm, a lubricant and a release agent. It may be used in plastic colorant concentrates to improve pigment wetting. In rigid PVC, it can accelerate fusion, improve flow, and reduce die swell.
- Applications in the personal care and pharmaceutical industry include tablet mold release, anti-tack agent, and gelling agent.
- Calcium stearate is a component in some types of defoamers.
- Anticaking agent for drugs etc.
