= Tadelakt =

Moroccan waterproof plaster

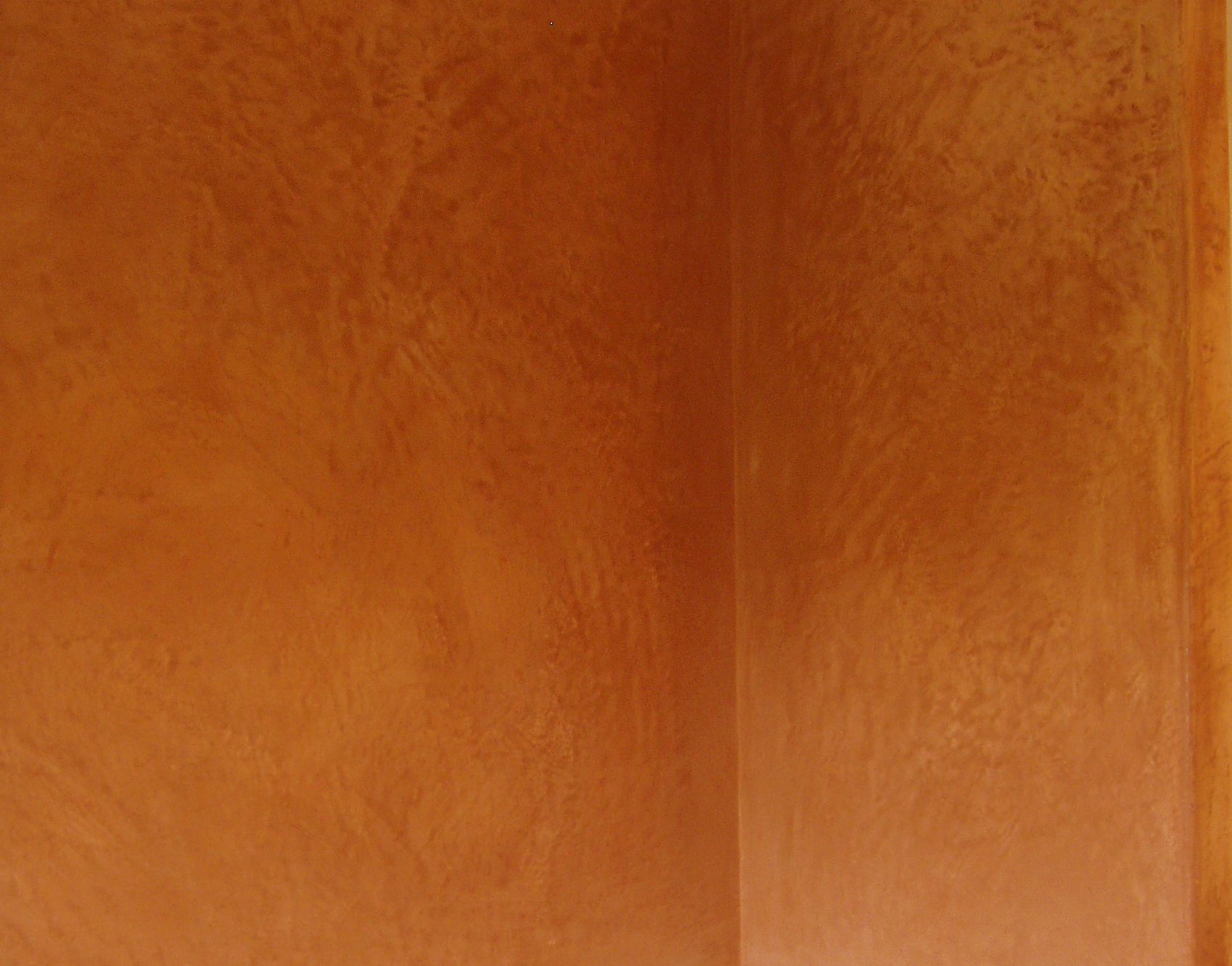
A tadelakt-covered wall

Tadelakt (Moroccan Arabic: تدلاكت, romanized: tadlākt) is a waterproof plaster surface used in Moroccan architecture to make baths, sinks, water vessels, interior and exterior walls, ceilings, roofs, and floors. It is made from lime plaster, which is rammed, polished, and treated with soap to make it waterproof and water-repellent. Tadelakt is labour-intensive to install, but durable. Since it is applied as a paste, tadelakt has a soft, undulating character, it can form curves, and it is seamless. Pigment can be added to give it any colour, but deep red is traditional. It may have a shiny or matte finish.

== Etymology ==
The term tadelakt, meaning "to rub in", is an Amazighified expression from the Arabic word تدليك tadlīk, meaning "to rub or massage."

== Constituents and chemistry ==
The basic constituents of tadelakt plaster are:

1. lime plaster (not Portland cement)
2. in some cases, marble or limestone sand (but not other aggregates)
3. natural soap (often "black" or olive oil soap) to speed carbonation of the surface and impart water-resistance.

The soap chemically reacts with the lime plaster, forming lime (calcium) soaps. Calcium soaps are insoluble in water, and fairly hard. They are familiar, in areas with calcium-rich ("hard") water, as deposits in bathtubs, sinks, and showers; when soap is mixed with the water's dissolved calcium carbonate/lime, calcium soaps form.

2 C_{17}H_{35}COO^{−}Na^{+} + Ca^{+}_{2} → (C_{17}H_{35}COO)_{2}Ca + 2 Na^{+}

== Techniques ==
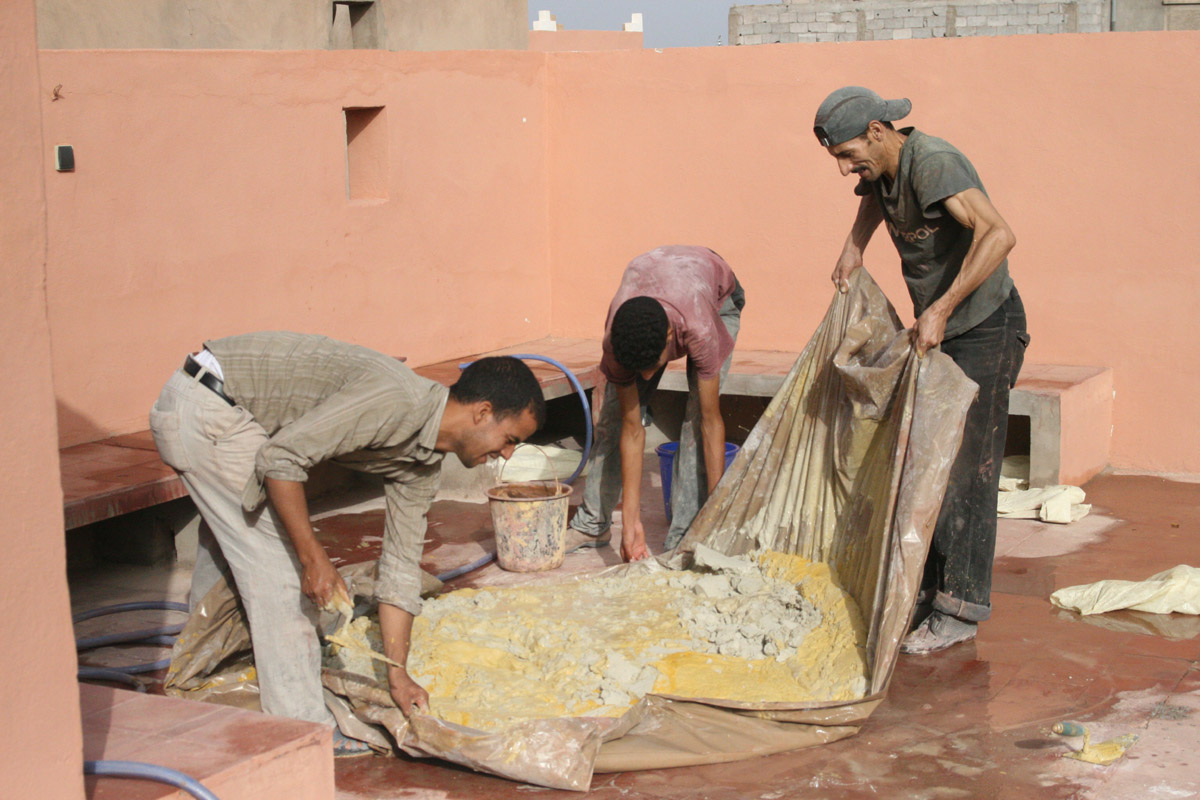
Mixing plaster powder with water and yellow pigment to make tadelakt in Riad Dar Rita, Ouarzazate, Morocco

Traditional application includes polishing with a river stone and treatment with oleic acid, in the form of olive oil soap, to lend it its final appearance and water resistance.

In Morocco, the traditional application technique:

- plaster powder is mixed with water for 12 to 15 hours prior to the addition of pigment.
- the plaster is applied in one thick coat with a wooden float, and smoothed with the same.
- before the plaster sets, a flat, smooth, hard stone is used to compress the plaster, then a plastic trowel used for the final polish.
- it is mechanically polished using stones or abrasives harder than the plaster, providing a smooth, sometimes shiny, finish.
- lastly, an olive-oil soap solution is used to seal the plaster

Long-term maintenance of tadelakt requires regularly re-sealing the surface with a soap solution; in the case of qadad roofs, this was traditionally done every few years.

== Uses ==
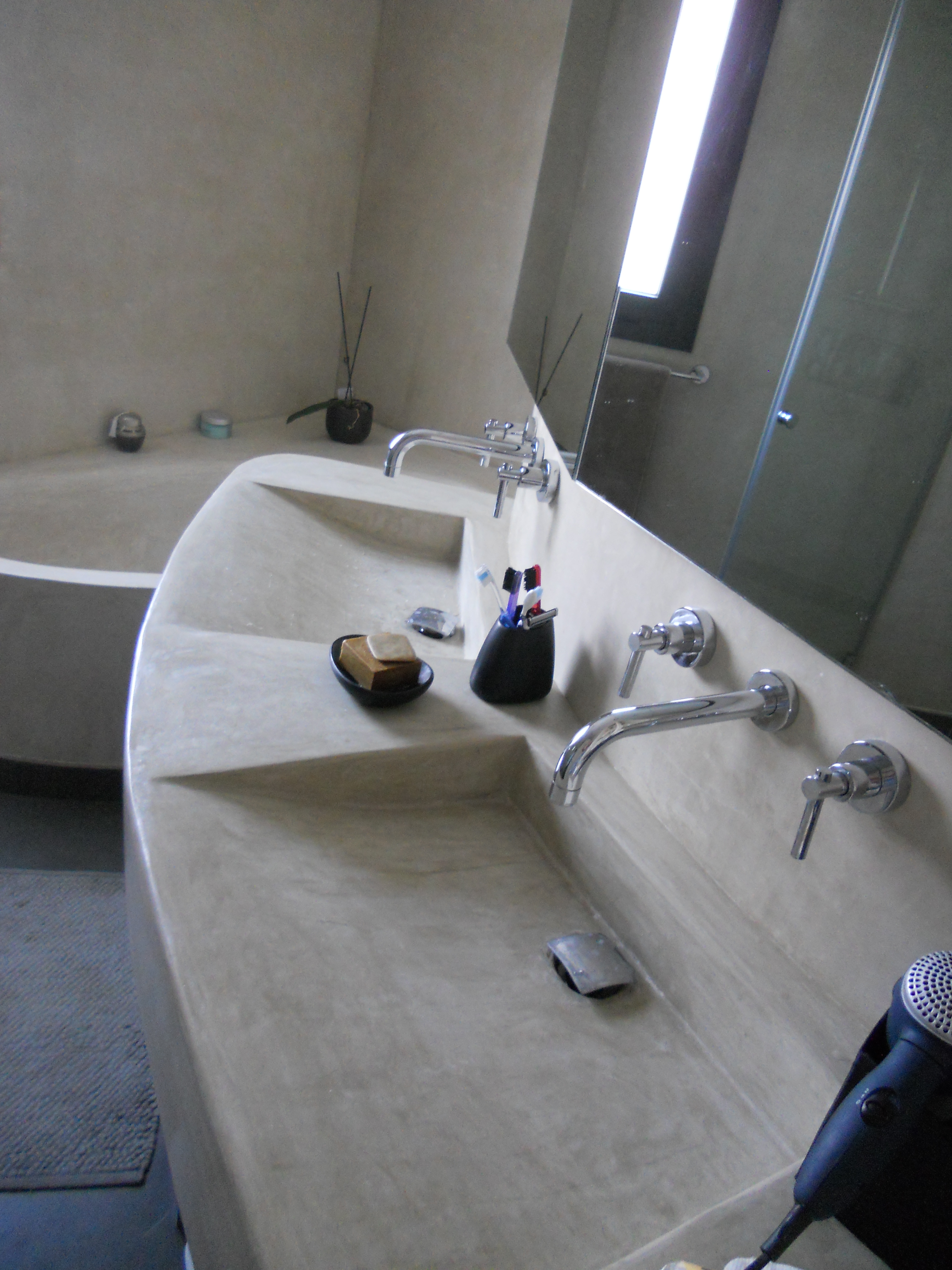
Modern bath, sinks, and walls made of tadelakt

Tadelakt is the traditional coating of the hammams and bathrooms of palaces and riad residences in Morocco. The restoration of riads in Morocco has led to a resurgence in its use.

In modern times, it has been used outside.

== See also ==
- Earthen plaster
- Polished plaster
- Plasterwork
- Sarooj, a similar water-resistant plaster
- Zellige
- Stucco
