= Amiriya Madrasa =

Madrasa in Rada, Yemen

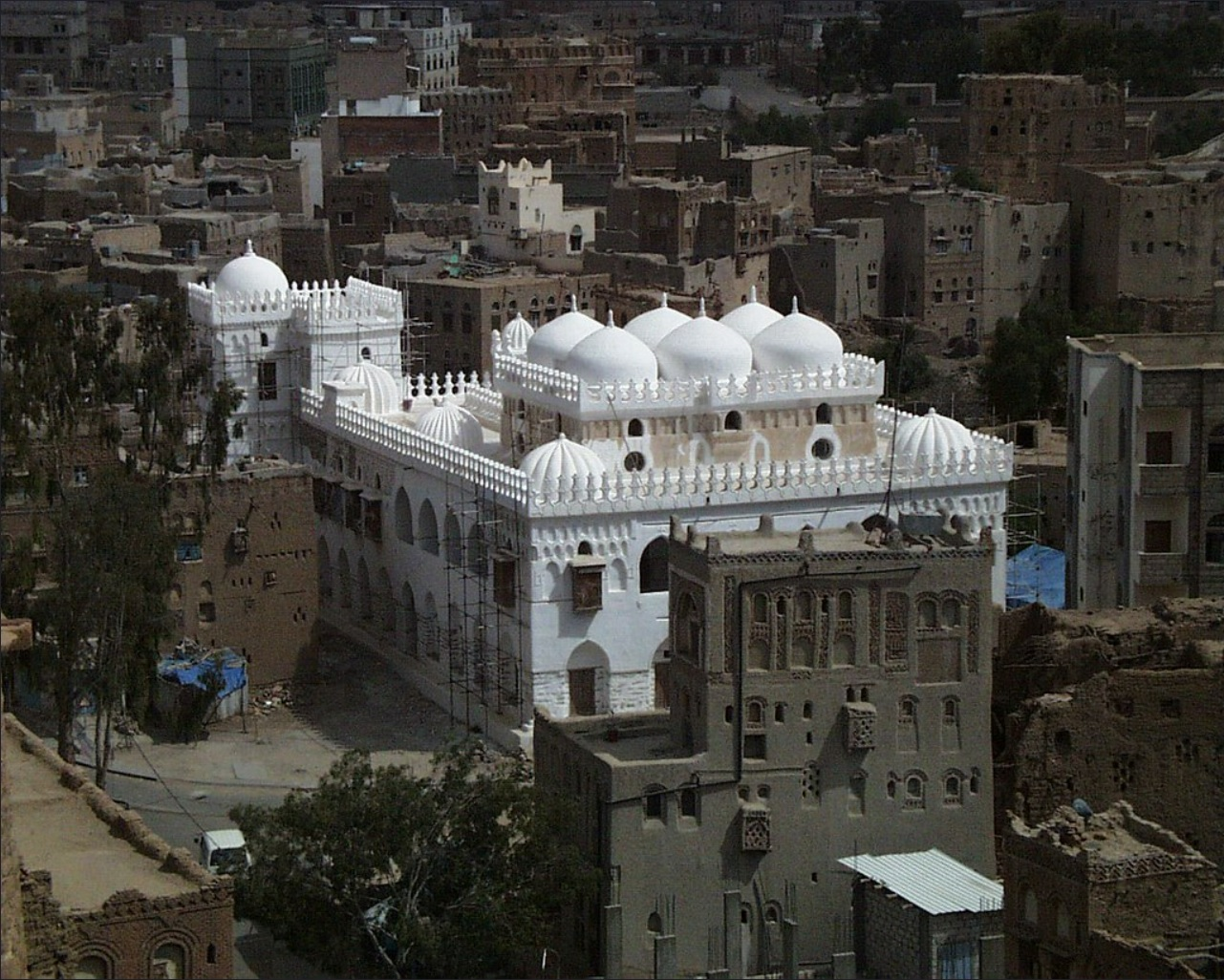
View of the Amiriya Madrasa

The Amiriya Madrasa (Arabic: المدرسة العامرية) is a 16th-century madrasa (educational institution) located in Rada, Yemen. It is under consideration for inscription as a UNESCO World Heritage Site. It was built in 1504 and is an example of the architecture of Tahirids, Yemen. The monument was in poor condition until 1978 when Iraqi-born archaeologist Selma Al-Radi saw it and enlisted financial help from foreign missions to restore it in a more than twenty-year effort which she led.

== History ==
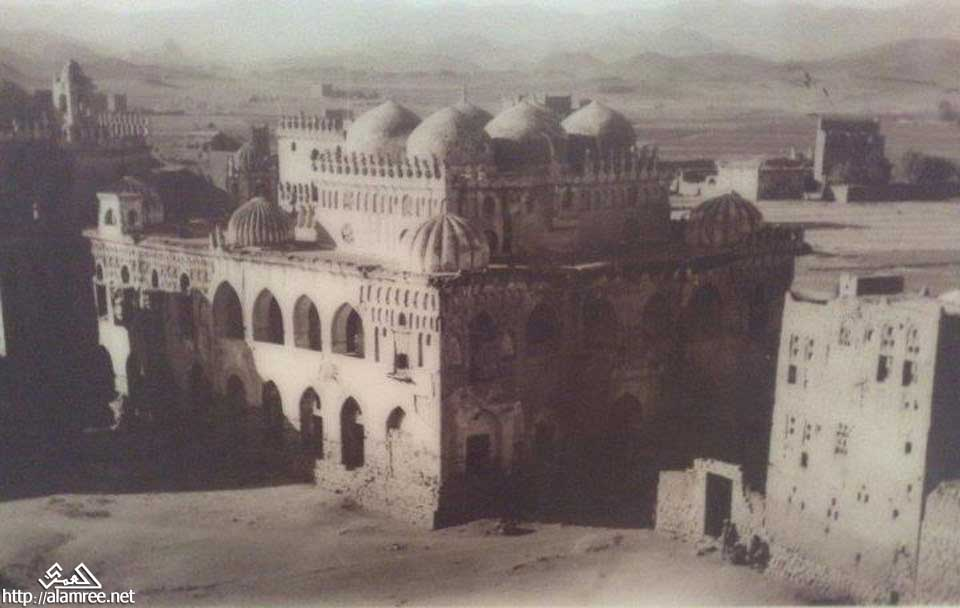
The Amiriya School

The complex was originally commissioned in 1504 by Amir ibn Abd Al-Wahhab, then Sultan of the Tahirid Dynasty, and was built in his name. The project was one of many sought by Wahhab, who had amassed significant wealth through trade across the Indian Ocean from the port city of Aden. Its date of completion was some time in 910 Rabi' al-Awwal of the Islamic calendar (August to September 1504). It was built to serve equally as a mosque, a madrasa and a private residence of Wahhab. Yemeni folklore tells that Wahhab occasionally ordered each window in the complex to be filled with lanterns as he rode on the hills of Radda with his daughter.

In 1517, Wahhab was killed in battle by invading forces from the Mamluk Sultanate, his head being decapitated and displayed on a pike in Sanaa. With the Tahirids defeated, the Mamluks ceded the former kingdom's territories including Radda to their allies in Yemen, the Zaydi imamate. The Zaydis, who were enemies to the Shafi'i-Sunni Tahirids, viewed the Madrasa's opulence as a distraction from prayers and incompatible with their interpretation of Islam. The Madrasa was left abandoned for several centuries afterwards as it fell into decay.

== Significance ==
This site was added to the UNESCO World Heritage Tentative List on July 8, 2002, in the Cultural category.

The restoration process revived the art of qadad, a form of waterproof interior and exterior plastering. In 2004 a documentary film, Qudad, Re-inventing a Tradition, was made on the subject by the filmmaker Caterina Borelli (preview).

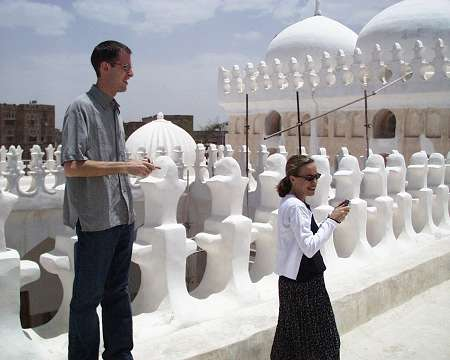
Close-up of part of the restored Amiriya Complex, showing white qadad

The restoration of the Amiriya Complex was awarded the Aga Khan Award for Architecture in 2007.

== See also ==
- More pictures of Amiriya Complex
- Qadad

== Bibliography ==
- Al-Radi, S.; Barnes, R.; Al-Nasiri, Y.; Porter, V.; Hillenbrand, R. (1997). The 'Amiriya in Rada' : the history and restoration of a sixteenth-century madrasa in the Yemen. Title of Series: Oxford studies in Islamic art; 13. Oxford: Oxford University Press, for the Board of the Faculty of Oriental Studies, University of Oxford. ISBN 0-19-728023-4
