= Earthen plaster =

Type of plaster

Earthen plaster is made of clay, sand and often mixed with plant fibers. The material is often used as an aesthetically pleasing finish coat and also has several functional benefits. This natural plaster layer is known for its breathability, moisture-regulating ability and ability to promote a healthy indoor environment. In the context of stricter indoor air quality regulations, earthen plaster shows great potential because of its properties as a building material.

== Physical composition ==
All plasters and stuccos have several common features: they all contain a structural component, a binding element, and some form of fiber. Usually the term plaster refers to a wall covering made from earth, lime or gypsum, while stucco uses a cement or synthetic binding element.

=== Clay: the binding agent ===
Clay, a crucial soil component with particles smaller than 2 micrometers, exhibits glue-like properties in the presence of water due to its extremely small particle size and high surface-to-volume ratio. This allows it to bind effectively with sand and fibers, playing a key role in holding the mixture together and securing it to the wall. Additionally, when clay is wet, its plasticity enhances the workability of plaster mixtures.

Within the domain of earthen building materials, clay particles act as primary binders. These particles not only provide workability during the plastic phase but also ensure cohesion after drying, contributing to the structural integrity of the construction. Notable clay minerals involved in this process include montmorillonite, chlorite and illite, each adding distinct properties to the composition. Despite the chemical variation among clays, their prevailing crystalline phases primarily consist of phyllosilicates, such as the mentioned clay minerals. The colloidal component further includes poorly crystalline hydrous aluminum silicates, along with iron and aluminum oxides.

The clay proportion significantly influences mixture characteristics, impacting strength, shrinkage, and mixing water requirements. However, it's essential to note that the recommended maximum clay content in the earth mixture is 25%.

=== Sand: structural strength ===
Sand, the granular skeletal component, provides structure, durability, and volume to earthen plasters. Consisting of tiny mineral particles derived from its original rock material, sand is predominantly made up of silicon dioxide (quartz) and is recognized as a non-reactive substance.

Sand is incorporated into the plaster mixture not just for structural purposes but also plays a vital role in minimizing the likelihood of cracks during the drying process. Moreover, the presence of sand not only helps in preventing cracks but also results in a reduction in the sorptive capacity of the mixture. This dual impact indicates the careful balancing act required in soil composition to achieve both structural integrity and controlled moisture absorption.

Given that sand naturally occurs in various subsoils, there's a possibility that all the necessary sand is already inherent in the soil.

=== Fiber: tensile strength and reinforcement ===
In the context of improving adhesion and compatibility with different substrates, fibers may be introduced to earthen plasters without compromising their environmental profile. Various natural fibers, such as dry straw, hemp, cattails, coconut fiber, shells, and animal hair, prove to be suitable choices for reinforcing earthen plasters.

Research indicates that the inclusion of natural fibers, moderately increases open porosity, facilitating improved pore interconnection. A meshwork is formed within the plaster, enhancing cohesion and providing flexibility to the dried mixture.

Clay tends to shrink and crack during drying, the added fibers effectively counteract these issues. The presence of fibers in the mixture significantly reduces drying shrinkage, with larger fibers exhibiting a more pronounced effect than finer ones. This reduction is attributed to the increased water content required for workability when adding more and finer fibers.

Exploring the physical performance changes resulting from the addition of natural fibers reveals a reduction in material density. The bulk density decreases with higher fiber content, while adhesion strength experiences a positive trend with the addition of fibers, particularly when more and finer fibers are incorporated.

The addition of fibers to plasters is observed to have various benefits, including reduced density, minimized shrinkage cracks, and improved adhesion strength. While the general influence on compressive strength and tensile strength may vary depending on base materials and fibers, the overall conclusion of the research affirms the positive impact of adding fibers to earthen plasters. This enhancement encompasses reduced heat conduction, decreased drying shrinkage, and an improved hygienic buffering capacity.

=== Water: viscosity ===
Water plays a crucial role in the formulation and application of clay plaster, impacting both its workability and structural integrity. As mentioned earlier, clay exhibits adhesive properties in the presence of water, emphasizing the waters vital role in providing structural support. The amount of water added is determined by the specific characteristics of the clay and the overall mixture proportions.

However, the balance between water content and plaster performance becomes apparent in the compressive strength of the material. An increase in initial water content can negatively affect compressive strength. Striking a balance is crucial. For optimal plasticity, the water requirement for plasters should fall within the liquid and plastic limits of the soil. Opting for a water-clay content close to the liquid boundary can enhance ease of application and mitigate surface cracking. The recommended approach is to maintain an initial water content between 30% and 40% of the clay's weight.

It's noteworthy that as the clay content in the mixture increases, so does the demand for water. However, a delicate equilibrium must be maintained to prevent potential shrinkage cracks associated with higher water content. Achieving an optimal water-clay ratio is crucial for utilize the benefits of clay plaster while preserving its structural integrity.

=== Additives ===
Additives can be incorporated into the composition of clay, sand, water, and fiber to enhance various properties of the plaster. Depending on the application, these additives may be selectively applied to the final coat or included in all layers. Many commonly used additives originate either from natural sources or result from industrial and agricultural processes, providing a cost-effective means to refine the characteristics of clay plaster. The diversity of additives allows for their blending in various proportions, each inducing distinct alterations in the plaster. Due to the absence of a comprehensive theoretical model explaining these effects, predicting the impact of a specific additive in a particular plaster mixture relies on empirical testing for each combination.

The primary utilization of additives revolves around addressing inherent weaknesses in clay plaster, such as dry shrinkage, mechanical strength, or adhesion. Furthermore, certain additives aim to enhance properties crucial for indoor applications, including thermal resistance and moisture buffering capacity.

==== Biopolymers ====
Biopolymers are a broad group of additives that are produced from plants or animals. They can serve many purposes: some biopolymers can act as a glue holding the matrix together, while others help fill cavities and supplement the particle distribution, both will increase the cohesion. This can cause multiple benefits: increased density often leads to an increase in overall strength, while less porous plasters prove more water resistant and durable. Some biopolymers also influence the viscosity and processability of the plaster, requiring less water and therefore reducing the dry shrinkage.

Some of the most common biopolymer additives are wheat flour paste, manure, cactus juice, casein (milk protein) and various natural oils such as linseed oil. Other additives include: stearate, tallow, tannin, leaves and bark of certain trees, natural gums and glues, kelp, powdered milk, or the blood of livestock.

===== Flour paste =====
Cooked flour paste is a cheap natural glue that is easy to make from common ingredients. The water and flour slurry is cooked until the gluten binds the elements of the mixture, creating a durable glue. In plaster, the flour paste serves as a binding agent and a hardener.

===== Manure =====
Manure serves as a binding agent and gives plaster more body. Manure also contains small natural fibers that provide additional tensile strength as well as reduce cracking and water erosion. Different types of manure have different effects. Horse manure has a high microfiber content, but cow manure has more hardening enzymes. People have reported success with llama and alpaca dung. Manure should be fresh or fermented when mixed with plaster, as composted manure loses its enzymes and adhesive qualities. Manure should be sifted before use.

===== Prickly pear cactus juice =====
The liquid from prickly pear cactus used to be one of the most common additives in the Americas.

The juice from the prickly pear cactus leaf pads will serve many functions. According to some sources, it helps the plaster set and increases its stickiness or adhesion. Cactus juice also serves as a stabilizer in that it helps make earthen plasters more water-resistant and more durable. It also prevents dusting.

Cactus juice can increase plaster's workability and its ability to be formed into the desired shape. Workability depends on the water content, the shape and size distribution of its aggregate (such as rock, sand, natural fiber, etc.), the age of the plaster, and the amount of other natural binder(s) (such as lime, wheatpaste, cactus juice, hardening vegetable oil, casein and other proteins, etc.) Altering the water content, changing the aggregate mix, soaking the clay, or changing the binders will increase or decrease the plaster's workability. Excessive water will lead to increased bleeding (surface water) and/or segregation of aggregates (when the natural binder and aggregates start to separate), with the resulting plaster having reduced quality. The use of an aggregate with an undesirable gradation can result in a very harsh mix design with a very low workability, which cannot be readily made more workable by addition of reasonable amounts of water or binder.

Cactus juice works well because it contains pectin, a water-soluble long-chain carbohydrate that acts as the binding agent to increase the adhesion of an earthen plaster. Pectin is also responsible for increasing the water resistance of an earthen plaster and has been used to augment lime plasters in both Mexico and the southwestern United States for hundreds of years.

Cactus juice is extracted by immersing cut leaves in water for as long as two weeks.

==== Other additives ====
===== Industrial waste =====
Certain industrial byproducts can be added to attain better mechanical properties, namely strength and shrinkage. Researchers have tested fly ash, limestone sludge, hydraulic lime and dextrin and its effects on the plaster.The addition of limestone sludge and hydraulic lime resulted in a reduced shrinkage when drying, which helps prevent cracks and improve adhesion to application surface. Fly ash and dextrin both improved the mechanical strength of the plaster. It should be noted however that the dosage proved to be very important for the final properties, with each additive showing different results depending on the amount that was mixed in.

===== Paper waste =====
Paper waste can also be included in the plaster to improve its hygrothermal properties. Because it is a waste product is often very cheap and broadly available. Research shows that the addition of paper waste improved the moisture buffering capacity of clay plaster, while also lowering its density. This lowering in density also means that the plaster becomes a better thermal insulator.

== Interior earthen plaster ==
Earthen plasters are becoming more popular in interior design due to its sustainable and eco-friendly characteristics. The plaster influences the thermal comfort, the indoor air quality and energy efficiency in a positive way. During the drying process however, there is shrinkage which affects its ability to adhere properly to the surface. This can be solved by using different types of wire meshes, using composite plasters or other additives. The other possibility is to paint a mixture of sand and wheat paste on to the surface on which the plaster will be applied.

There are different ways to applicate the earthen plaster. The plaster can be applied in three coats, this is the Spanish process known as 'alisando'. The first layer is the scratch coat which provides adherence for the second layer the brown coat or levelling coat. The final layer is the color coat or finishing coat. This layer is usually clay with sand but without fiber. Other manufacturers only apply the color/finishing coat. This single layer provides less of the advantages discussed later, but it still has advantages compared to gypsum plaster.

=== Effect on indoor climate ===
In principle, all wall coverings have an effect on the room climate: vapour permeable coatings designed to be capillary conductive, allow the wall layers behind them to absorb moisture and release it again. Due to the property of clay plasters to absorb moisture, a buffer is created on the wall, which absorbs moisture and releases it again when the air humidity is low. The area and the thickness of the plastered wall have the greatest influence on the ability of the clay plaster to act as a climatic buffer. The majority of the moisture is kept in the top layer of the clay plaster, so this layer is the most important for the climate buffer effect. Clay also has a high specific heat capacity, this allows the clay plaster to compensate for temperature fluctuations in the room.

==== Moisture buffering ====
Moisture has a significant impact on the indoor environment of a building. Excessive moisture can lead to mold growth, poor air quality, and structural damage. Conversely, a too dry environment can cause discomfort, affecting both health and material preservation. Effective moisture regulation is therefore crucial for a healthy, sustainable, and comfortable living environment. Clay is renowned for its remarkable ability to regulate moisture, a property known as moisture buffering.

Clay possesses the unique capability to both adsorb and absorb water. Adsorption refers to the retention of moisture on the surface of clay particles, while absorption pertains to the uptake of moisture into the material's pores. As the humidity in a space rises, clay can absorb excess moisture. At lower humidity levels, clay gradually releases the absorbed moisture through evaporation.

The porous nature of clay and its high specific surface area, contribute to its moisture-buffering properties. The pores act as reservoirs where moisture can be retained and released. Additionally, the clay content plays a role in moisture buffering. Clay naturally attracts and holds water molecules. Consequently, a higher clay content results in enhanced buffering, although it does not necessarily translate to improved clay plaster. However, clay has the drawback of shrinking as it dries. A higher clay content in the clay plaster may lead to increased shrinkage, potentially causing crack formation.

Not only does the clay content, but also the mineralogical composition, play a crucial role. Clay is considered hygroscopic, indicating its ability to absorb water from the surrounding environment. This contributes to the regulation of relative humidity in a space. However, different clay minerals exhibit varying hygroscopicity. For instance, the montmorillonite clay mineral demonstrates high hygroscopicity, whereas kaolinite exhibits low hygroscopicity. Clay plasters with different compositions and ratios will consequently have distinct moisture-buffering capacities.

==== Ozone ====
===== General information =====
Ozone reacts with many indoor materials, as well with compounds in the indoor air. Reactions between ozone and building surfaces are able to generate and release aerosols and irritating carcinogenic gases, they may be irritating or harmful for building occupants. Indoor air quality is very important, because it is known that most of the people in developed countries spend almost 90% of their lives indoor. In a human body, ozone reacts with tissue cells that promote inflammation and increased permeability of the epithelial lining fluid, which allows for greater penetration of pollutants from lung air into the blood stream. Several studies show that there are some PRMs, passive removal materials, that passively, without using energy, remove ozone out of the indoor air without generating harmful byproducts. Clay wall plaster appears a promising passive removal material for ozone, due to its relatively high ozone reaction probability.

===== Production of ozone =====
Ozone is produced outdoors, but there are also sources of ozone in indoor environments, for example laser printers, photocopy machines. Various measurements show that the indoor ozone concentration closely tracks outdoor concentration and it is dependent on the air exchange rate. The indoor ozone concentration divided by the outdoor ozone concentration (I/O) remains relatively constant.

===== Indoor air pollution =====
Many sources contribute to indoor air pollution. There are pollutants originate from the outside and pollutants which originate from indoor materials. Outdoor air pollutants are classified as biological pollutants (UOB), such as ozone, sulfur oxides, nitrogen oxides, benzene and lead compounds... . The pollutants originating from the interior of the building are building compounds and chemicals released from the indoor materials and pollutants resulting from human and machine activities. They are examined in three categories. The first category includes pollutants, second gases and chemicals, last particles and fibers. There are two types of indoor air pollutants. Primary pollutants or VOC's can be emitted directly from a surface. Secondary pollutants or VOC's are caused by gas-phase transformations or surface oxidation. An important difference between primary and secondary VOC's is the temporal evolution. The emission of primary VOC's decline at a predictable rate and reduces to lower levels within a year. The emission of secondary VOC's is more prolonged and can continue for several years. Examples of secondary pollutants, which are more damaging for human health, are aldehydes, ketones and SOA.

Passive removal materials are an alternative method for removing ozone from indoor environments. The characteristics of a passive removal material are, removing ozone out of indoor environments without consuming energy, ozone removal over long time, minimal reaction product formation, large surface area coverage, while maintaining aesthetic appeal. PRM's for ozone are inorganic materials, including clay-based bricks and plasters.

===== Ozone reactions =====
There are two types of reactions that take place. Gas-phase, or homogeneous reactions take place between ozone and some chemicals that are emitted to indoor air. For example, alkenes emitted from building materials, furniture, and numerous cleaning and consumer products. These homogeneous reactions can produce secondary organic aerosols (SOA's) as well as a range of gaseous oxidized products. There are also surface or heterogeneous reactions that can occur on furniture, dust, human skin.

These reactions can produce C1-C10 carbonyls, dicarbonyls and hydroxycarbonyls, that may be irritating or harmful to building occupants.

===== Effect of indoor air pollution on human health =====
Important things to consider when talking about the impact of indoor air pollution on human health are the way of exposure to the pollutants, the interaction of the pollutants with their surrounding environment and the identification of the source. The nose and lungs are the parts of the human body which are most exposed to indoor air pollution, which is logically as the respiratory system is most affected by indoor air pollution. The size of the pollutants is also an important factor. Particles with a diameter greater than 10 microns are trapped in mouth and nose, smaller particles can pass through the mouth and nose into the respiratory system. The smallest particles of 2-3 microns can pass through the lungs and stick to the alveoli.

===== Quantified parameters ozone =====
====== Deposition velocity ======
Deposition velocity = is a mass-transfer coefficient that relates the bulk-air concentration to the flux of ozone to a surface.

1. Deposition velocity = is a mass-transfer coefficient that relates the bulk-air concentration to the flux of ozone to a surface.

Clay wall plaster and clay wall paint have a very high deposition velocity. In general, fleecy and porous materials exhibit higher deposition velocities than smooth sealed surfaces. The high deposition velocities exhibited by clay wall plaster or paint may be due to iron or aluminum catalyzed decomposition of ozone.

$v_d=\frac{\lambda V}{A}\Bigl(\frac{C_{in}}{C_e}-1\Bigr)-v_{d,w}\Bigl(\frac{A_w-A}{A}-1\Bigr)$

====== Reaction probability ======
2. Reaction probability is the probability of reaction if an ozone molecule collides with a surface. Where <$v_d$> is the Boltzmann velocity ($1,30\cdot10^{-6}mh^{-1}$ for ozone at 296K)

$\gamma=\frac{4}{<v_b>}\Bigl(\frac{1}{v_d}-\frac{1}{v_t}\Bigr)^{-1}$

Reaction probabilities for clay paint in comparison to clay plaster are higher. The clay paint is statistically more reactive than the clay plaster because it contains cellulose and alcohol esters, two components who reacts with ozone. Reaction probabilities of clay plaster are due to its major component, kaolinite. Kaolinite is a hydrous aluminosilicate mineral that comprises 50% of the clay plaster. Consistent with the trend for deposition velocity, fleecy and porous materials exhibit higher reaction probabilities than smooth, non-porous materials.

====== yield ======
3. Yield= molar yield is defined as the molar emission rate of carbonyl compounds formed due to reactions between the material and ozone divided by the molar flux of ozone between the material surface.

$Y=\frac{C_{iO_3}-C_{iO}}{C_{O_3in}-C_{O_3e}}$

Of the highly reactive materials, only clay-based wall plaster combines very low yields with high ozone removal rates.

Clay wall plaster exhibited very high deposition velocities and negligible yields. Clay and materials containing clay (e.g. bricks) consume ozone readily, perhaps because of a reaction catalyzed by metals present in the clay. Clay plaster with very high ozone uptake rates, has certain surface roughness, and porosity. Several studies propose that the high aluminum or iron content and high surface area combine to make the clay plaster, a particularly good ozone scavenging building material. Field test show that materials as clay paint and carpet become less reactive over interval of years, probably due to slow oxidation of organic coatings. This process is named as "ozone aging". Clay does not appear to become substantially less reactive. Clay plaster has the ability to "regenerate" after periods without lot of ozone exposure. Materials composed of clay are not necessarily good at removing ozone. Even though they are composed of clay, ceramic tiles exhibit low deposition velocities.

====== Surface removal ======
Ozone surface removal rate of a material ($k_{sr,O_3}$) depends on its ozone deposition rate ($K_{d,O_3}$), surface area (A) and volume (V) of the enclosed space in which the material is placed.

$k_{sr,O_3}=k_{d,0_3}\left[ \frac{A}{V} \right]$

There is emerging evidence suggesting alternative indoor materials that can be used to reduce indoor ozone concentration (gas phase) with minimum oxidation product consequences. These materials are termed PRM's. It is suggested that PRM ozone removal effectiveness could be as high as 80% depending on the panel surface area and air speed across the panel.

====== Emission rates ======
Clay based paint has higher emission rates of $\ce{C5-C10}$ n-aldehydes compared to clay plaster. The presence of $\ce{C5-C10}$ n-aldehydes, benzaldehyde and tolualdehyde reaction products led to lower assessment of perceived air quality.

====== Relative humidity and temperature ======
Evidence have shown that indoor air parameters: relative humidity, temperature and ozone concentrations influence test results. Higher ozone concentrations can result in lower reaction probabilities and lower yields. Reaction probabilities can also fluctuate if there are modifications of the material surface (e.g. deposition of skin oils, cooking oils), then there is an increased reactivity. At higher temperatures the deposition velocity of ozone is slightly higher. The higher the relative humidity, the larger the deposition velocities of ozone to different surface and the larger the surface removal rate. The more hydrophilic the surface, the larger the effect.

====== "air purifying" (M) ======
Room ozonization has been used to freshen indoor air for more than 100 years. Several companies offer ozone generators that claim to remove chemical pollutants from indoor air. They claim that ozone can oxidize airborne gases, and particulates, to simple carbon dioxide and water vapor and that it can also remove unpleasant odors. Several studies have shown that the use of an ozone generator to improve the indoor air quality isn't the best option. Ozone concentrations less than 100 ppb have negligible effects on the majority of gaseous pollutants. There are some indoor air pollutants that react with ozone at a meaningful rate but these compounds typically represent less than 10% percent of the total gas phase pollutants. It can also be dangerous to use ozone generators. It is difficult to control the ozone concentration and to high concentrations can lead to several complaints.

====== Conclusion ======
Clay is a very promising passive removal material for ozone in many studies. Given the very high deposition velocities, it would substantially reduce indoor ozone concentrations without generating byproducts. Reaction probabilities of clay plaster are due to its major component, kaolinite. Kaolinite is a hydrous aluminosilicate mineral that comprises 50% of the clay plaster. Clay wall plaster can help to improve the indoor air quality, which is very important nowadays, because most of the people spend 90% of their lives indoors.

==== Perception of comfort ====
Manufacturers of clay plasters often seek to draw attention to the positive impact of their products on air quality, emphasizing the improvements that clay plasters could bring about. In scientific literature, references to the favorable influence of clay plasters on indoor air quality are often superficial, with many studies primarily focusing on the hygroscopic behavior or $\ce{CO2}$ absorption of clay plasters.

A study by Darling et al. (2012) concluded that clay plaster has a positive impact on indoor air quality, especially in the presence of ozone, with or without the presence of carpet. The highest levels of air quality acceptance were observed when only clay plaster was present or when both clay plaster and carpet were present without ozone. Introducing clay plaster into a less favorable situation (carpet + ozone) resulted in significantly lower concentrations of both ozone and aldehyde, thereby significantly improving indoor air quality.

It is crucial to maintain a critical stance regarding the claim that clay plasters should improve indoor air quality. While the research by Darling et al. (2012) suggests positive results, additional research is necessary to confirm these findings.

==== Minerals ====
===== Components =====
Earthen plasters consist of various clay minerals that can influence the properties and performance of the plaster in numerous ways. Those minerals include kaolinite, halloysite, montmorillonite, bentonite, saponite, vermiculite, illite, sepiolite and palygorskite, zeolites (more used as an additive), chlorite and smectite.

The global distribution of clay minerals in modern oceans reveals patterns. With kaolinite and smectite concentrated in tropical zones, while chlorite and illite predominate in temperate and high latitudes. Smectite, which has a high absorption capacity for organic substances, significantly influences the adsorption of organic materials in sedimentary environments, potentially impacting geological phenomena such as hydrocarbon formation and oil and gas exploration. Some of these minerals provide certain advantages in regard to indoor air quality. The most important one's are listed below.

Bentonites: Acid-activated bentonites exhibit increased gas adsorption, especially of $\ce{SO2}$, due to crucial surface properties. However, the process may lower pH and release cations.

Kaolinites: Although smectites generally have superior gas adsorption properties, kaolinites can be enhanced through modifications, such as exchanging amorphous kaolinite with alkali metals.

Zeolites: Zeolites, serving as molecular sieves, are utilized for selective adsorption based on size, with applications in $\ce{CO2}$capture and water purification.

Pillared Clays: With thermal stability and a large surface area, pillared clays are deployed for gas adsorption, including hydrogen ($\ce{H2}$) and nitrogen oxides ($\ce{NOx}$).

When adsorbing pollutants, the imbedded clay forms bonds with other substances in three ways: through Si-O bonds, OH groups, and van der Waals forces. Clay minerals, including smectite, illite, and kaolinite, exhibit different clay layers with a specific configuration of Si-O groups and OH groups, determining both physical and chemical properties.

These natural adsorption qualities can be enlarged by improving certain parameters. This is the case when the textural qualities are improved by increasing the porosity and specific surface area. This can be achieved by an acid treatment or by adding additives like other minerals or organic substances.

===== Additives =====
====== Zeolites ======
Zeolites have a proven effect on the removal efficiency of VOC's in the indoor air. Especially when a photocatalyst is used, the adsorption reaction can be very effective (up to 90% removal efficiency) according to some studies, in improving indoor air quality and olfactory comfort. As a possible additive of plaster zeolites have also given very promising results in multiple studies particularly when natural zeolites are used. Nevertheless, the concentration of VOC's adsorbed by the plaster, were partly released again later. The higher the temperature the larger this effect appears to be.

===== Active carbon =====
Active carbon can also be embedded into a plaster matrix and has shown positive effects on the indoor air quality. The plaster matrix can be used to form a modular sink that can be installed and removed very easily. Big advantage of this is the minimal adaptations and renovations that the existing structure needs to undergo in order to have this passive effect. The removal rate of a plaster containing active carbon, increases when the external surface and the thickness of the sink increase. An increase in the active carbon concentration that the plaster contains, will also increase the removal efficiency to some extent. Above a certain concentration of carbon this rate will not increase any further (above 20% for low concentrations and above 50% for high concentrations). Unfortunately, in the case of active carbon, the adsorption of VOC's is not easily reversed, meaning the adsorption potential of an active carbon-based plaster is finite. For now, the active lifetime of such a plaster remains unknown. Some studies present a possible lifetime of 20 but this could be a large exaggeration. More research on this is necessary.

===== Other possibilities =====
Various modifications of clay minerals, including organomontmorillonites, demonstrate reversible $\ce{CO2}$capture at room temperature. Inorganic-organic composite sorbents are also suitable for $\ce{CO2}$capture. Other studies have also proven that clay as a component can have a positive influence on the removal rate of organic acids. More research on this part is necessary.

=== Advantages and disadvantages of earthen plaster ===
==== Advantages ====
Earth plasters have many advantages. Consisting mainly of clay, sand and possibly straw, they are a 100% renewable product and contain no harmful substances. Compared to other wall coverings, they are less toxic and energy-intensive, as little energy is required in extraction, production and processing, making them attractive to environmentally conscious people. Moreover, they are easier to repair and cheap. In addition, earthen patches can improve PAQ (Perceived Air Quality). They have a low impact on the environment and have the ability to regulate the hydrothermal conditions of the indoor environment, which can lead to better public health. When decomposed, clay plaster leaves no ecological footprint and since it contains no synthetic additives, it can be recycled and reused indefinitely. It is a circular product. Loam can also practice its role of humidity regulator and they can be applied to most types of supports for renovation or in construction. It is a water-vapor permeable material and has a high storage/heat release capacity, contributing to thermal comfort, improved air quality and energy efficiency. It is a bio-based material that has high breathability due to its hygroscopic porous structure, which also contributes to moisture buffering.

==== Disadvantages ====
The downside, however, is their mechanical strength and resistance to the action of climatic factors, their reduced degree of compatibility with classic finishing materials currently available on the market. In addition, earthen plasters have a high risk of fissuring during the drying process due to their significant shrinkage and high sensitivity to water. If the mixture does not have the right proportions of components, many other problems can occur, such as dust formation and cracks. They are often more labor-intensive (high cost) than other forms of wall coverings and have a granular texture, which, on contact, stains. The odor left by the material is also often found to be disturbing. Finally, a lot of issues surrounding earthen plasters are still undetermined or often read assumptions rather than facts. This shows that the material thus has potential, but there is still a lot of testing to be done around it.

== See also ==
- Building construction
- Exterior Insulation Finishing System
- Green building
- Natural building
- Plasterwork
- Tadelakt
- Wattle and daub
- Zellige

== Sources ==
- McHenry, Paul Graham Jr. Adobe: Build it Yourself. The University of Arizona Press: Tucson. 1974.
- Norton, John. Building with Earth: A Handbook. Intermediate Technology Publications Limited: London 1997.
