= Seroja =

Seroja may refer to:

- Cyclone Seroja
- Operation Seroja, the Indonesian invasion of East Timor
