= Saroj Perera =

Sri Lankan businessman (born 1960)

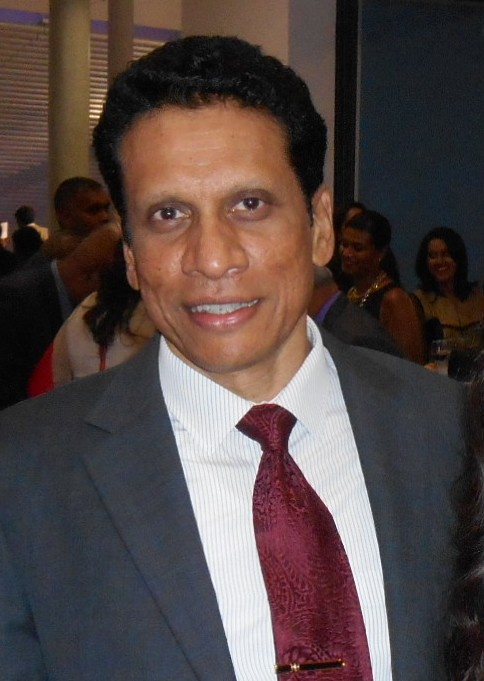
- Born: 13 April 1960 (age 66); Colombo, Sri Lanka
- Occupations: Chairman and Managing Director of DSL Group of Companies
- Spouse: Kanchana Perera
- Children: Gayara & Jayan Onel
- Website: douglasdsl.com

Saroj Perera (born 13 April 1960) is a Sri Lankan businessman and chairman and managing director of DSL Group of Companies, one of the leading private sector companies in Sri Lanka.

== Early life ==
Perera was born on 13 April 1960 in Colombo to a Sri Lankan political and business family. He was the youngest son of B.T. Douglas Perera who was ex chief organiser of Sri Lanka Freedom Party for the Borella Electorate and contested 1977 parliamentary election but was defeated. and his mother was Hema Perera. Saroj has two brothers and a sister, Ranoj, Dakshini and Dulip.

== DSL Group ==
Douglas & Sons (Pvt) Ltd was incorporated in 1980, and started its commercial operations in July 1986, Popularly known as DSL among trade partners and customers. Douglas & Sons (Pvt) Ltd is the founder member company in DSL Group of Companies. DSL launched GS Yuasa batteries, which imports Japanese manufactured batteries renowned for high quality and durability. This is the only Japanese battery currently availably in the Sri Lankan battery market.

DSL is also a leading manufacturer and supplier of soft toys, with two factories at free trade zone Biyagama and one at Kosgoda in Galle. It handles all exports to the European and American market, through famous retail chains such as Marks and Spencer, Harrods, ASDA and Hamleys.

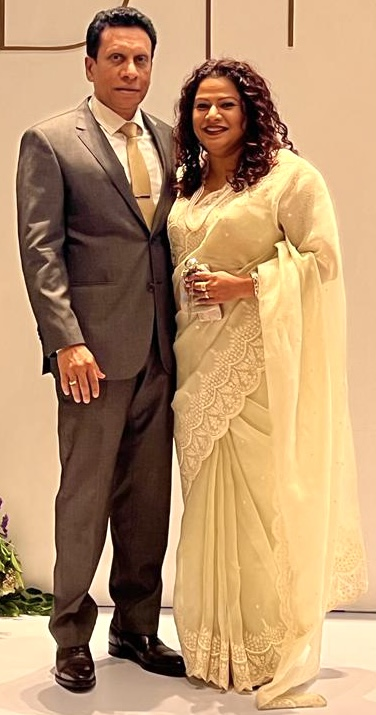
Mr. Saroj Perera & Mrs. Kanchana Perera

=== Business entities of DSL Group ===
- Douglas and Sons (Private) Limited
- DSL IT Solutions (Private) Limited
- Ronet Marketing (Private) Limited
- Ekway Lanka (Private) Limited
- G. C. Roach (Private) Limited
- DSL Marketing (Private) Limited
- DSL Investments (Private) Limited
- DSL Lanka (Private) Limited
- Douglas Travels & Tours Pvt. Ltd
- DSL Logistics Pvt. Ltd

== Family ==
Perera is married to Kanchana (daughter of Ranjith & Ophelia Perera and grand daughter of Mr & Mrs K. Cyril C. Perera) and has two children, a daughter Gayara and a son, Jayan Onel.
