= Hydraulic lime =

Substance used to make lime mortar

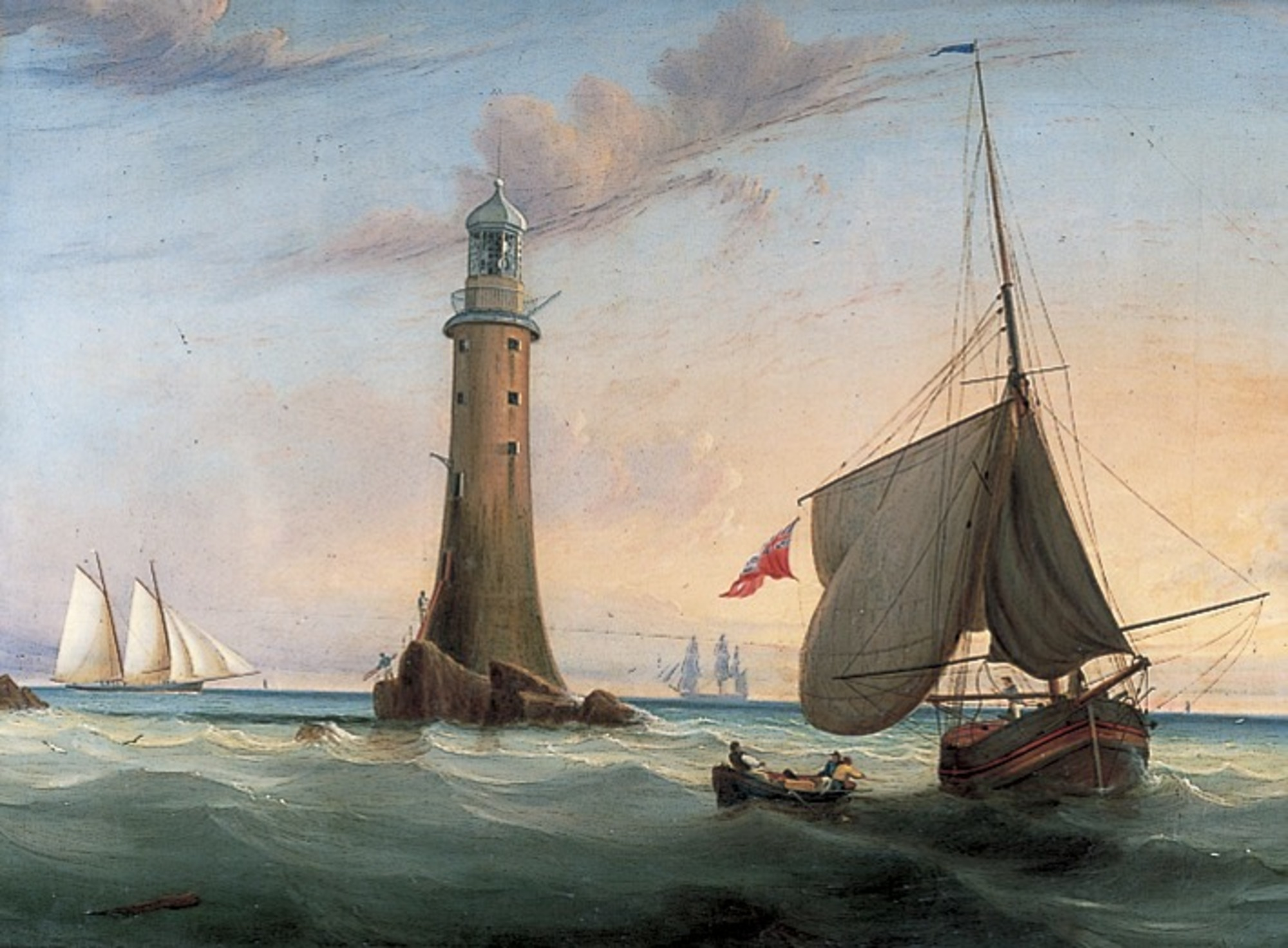
Smeaton's Eddystone Lighthouse. John Smeaton is credited with pioneering hydraulic lime in the 18th century, which led to the development of Portland cement and thus modern concrete. Painting by John Lynn.

Hydraulic lime (HL) is a general term for a variety of lime different from calcium oxide (quicklime) that sets by hydration, and consists of calcium silicate and calcium aluminate, compounds that can harden in contact with water. This contrasts with calcium hydroxide, also called slaked lime or air lime that is used to make lime mortar, the other common type of lime mortar, which sets by carbonation (re-absorbing carbon dioxide (CO_{2}) from the air). Hydraulic lime provides a faster initial set and higher compressive strength than air lime, and hydraulic lime will set in more extreme conditions, including under water.

The terms 'hydraulic lime' and 'hydrated lime' are quite similar and may be confused but are not necessarily the same material. Hydrated lime is any lime which has been slaked whether it sets through hydration, carbonation, or both.

Calcium reacts in the lime kiln with the clay minerals to produce silicates that enable some of the lime to set through hydration. Any unreacted calcium is slaked to calcium hydroxide which sets through carbonation. These are sometimes called 'semi-hydraulic lime' and include the classifications feebly and moderately hydraulic lime, NHL 2 and NHL 3.5.

== Types ==
There are two basic types of hydraulic limes:

=== Natural hydraulic lime (NHL) ===
Natural hydraulic lime (NHL) is produced by heating (calcining) limestone that naturally contains clay and other impurities: no materials need to be added to create the hydraulicity. In the United States NHL may be called 'hydrated hydraulic lime' (HHL) per ASTM C-141 Standard Specification for Hydrated Hydraulic Lime for Structural Purposes.

=== Artificial hydraulic lime (AHL) ===
Artificial hydraulic lime (AHL) or artificial lime (AL) becomes hydraulic when hydraulic and/or pozzolan materials are added either before or after burning in a lime kiln. Artificial limes are more specifically identified as 'hydraulic lime' (HL), as defined European Norm 459 (EN-459), "Consists of lime and other materials such as Portland cement, blast furnace slag, fly ash, limestone filler and other suitable materials."; 'formulated lime' (FL) (EN-459) consists of "...mainly of hydrated lime and or NHL with added hydraulic and/or pozzolanic material. It is identical to HL but its composition must be declared on the CE marking.". 'Pozzolanic hydraulic lime' (PHL) (ASTM C-1707) is "very similar to HL or FL. Consists mainly of hydrated lime with one or more pozzolans with possible inclusion of inert filler. When Portland cement, even traces, is present (can be up to 20% of binder weight), it has to be labeled as 'PHLc'."

== Characteristics ==
Hydraulic lime is a useful building material for the following reasons:

- It has a low elastic modulus.
- There is no need for expansion (movement) joints.
- It allows buildings to "breathe", and does not trap moisture in the walls.
- It has a lower firing temperature than Portland cement, and thus can be manufactured with less energy.
- Stone and brickwork bonded with lime is easier to re-use.
- Lime acts sacrificially in that it is weaker and breaks down more readily than the masonry, thus saving weaker stone such as sandstone and limestone from the harmful effects of temperature expansion and mortar freeze.
- It is less dense than cement, thus less cold bridging.
- Lime re-absorbs the carbon dioxide (CO_{2}) emitted by its calcination (firing in a kiln), thus partially offsetting the large amount emitted during its manufacture. The more hydraulic a lime, the less CO_{2} is reabsorbed during set, for example, 50% of CO_{2} is reabsorbed by NHL 3.5 during the set, compared to 100% of CO_{2} being reabsorbed by pure calcium hydroxide (fat lime putty).

== Hydraulic lime concrete ==
Hydraulic lime concretes have been in use since Roman times, either as mass foundation concretes or as lightweight concretes using tufa or pumice as aggregates and a wide range of pozzolans to achieve different strengths and speeds of set. This meant that lime could be used in a wide variety of applications including floors and even vaults or domes. An example is the Pantheon in Rome, which has survived for nearly two thousand years. The dome's diameter is equal to its height from the floor. It is constructed from six different lime mixes, which change the properties and lightness of the material.

== Classification ==
Natural hydraulic lime (NHL) is classified for different uses the first two of which are sometimes called semi-hydraulic lime because they initially set with water but continue to set in contact with carbon dioxide in the air.

=== Feebly hydraulic lime ===
Feebly hydraulic lime (NHL 2) is used for internal work and external work in sheltered areas.

Feebly hydraulic lime contains up to 10% clay / clay mixed with other impurities. It might take one week or more to set after the addition of water. Setting is the process of permanently taking the shape into which lime has been moulded.

=== Moderately hydraulic lime ===
Moderately hydraulic lime (NHL 3.5) can be used for external work in most areas.

Moderately hydraulic lime contains clay in the range of 11% to 20%. This type of lime sets (assumes given shape) within a few days after the addition of water.

=== Eminently hydraulic lime ===
Eminently hydraulic lime (NHL 5) is used for external work in exposed areas, such as chimneys and for floor slabs/underpinning.

Eminently hydraulic lime contains clay in the range of 21% to 30%. Properties of eminently hydraulic lime are close to those of cement. Eminently hydraulic lime sets within one day after the addition of water.

== Benefits ==
- Hydraulic limes gain strength over time hence providing flexibility and avoiding the need for expansion joints.
- Considered to be more environmentally friendly than portland cement as they are burnt at a lower temperature and uniquely re-absorb some of the carbon dioxide given off during burning as they cure/carbonate in/on the wall.
- Enable building components to be reclaimed and reused as they are 'softer' than cement.
- Set under water hence making them ideal for applications in contact with the sea, canals, rivers etc.

== See also ==
- Lime plaster
- Lime mortar
- Hempcrete
