= Qadad =

Old technique used in plastering walls and cisterns

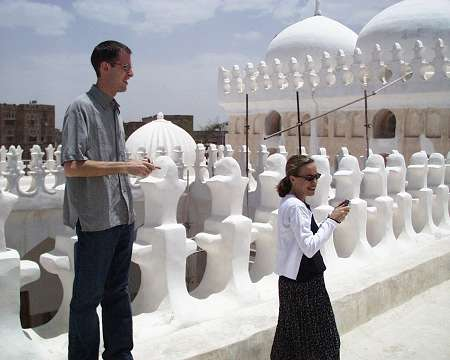
The Amiriya School, built of qadad

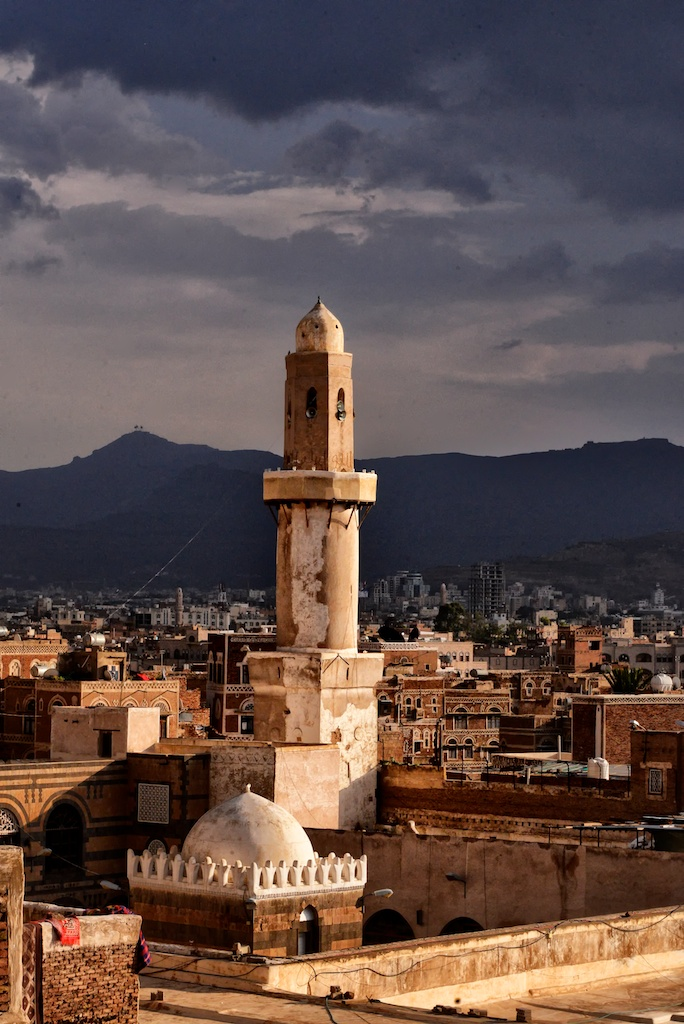
A minaret of the over 1300-year-old Great Mosque of Sana'a in Yemen, which is built with qadad. It is now being restored.

Qadad (Arabic: قضاض, romanized: qaḍāḍ) or qudad is a waterproof plaster surface, made of a lime plaster treated with slaked lime and oils and fats. The technique is over a thousand years old, with the remains of this early plaster still seen on the standing sluices of the ancient Marib Dam.

Volcanic ash, pumice, scoria (Arabic: شاش), in the Yemeni dialect, or other crushed volcanic aggregate are often used as pozzolanic agents, reminiscent of ancient Roman lime plaster which incorporated pozzolanic volcanic ash.

Due to the slowness of some of the chemical reactions, qadad mortar can take over a hundred days to prepare, from quarrying of raw materials to the beginning of application to the building. It can also take over a year to set fully.

In 2004, a documentary film Qudad, Re-inventing a Tradition was made by the filmmaker Caterina Borelli. It documents the restoration of the Amiriya Complex, which was awarded the Aga Khan Award for Architecture in 2007.

== Traditional preparation ==
After collecting blocks of lime stone, they were fired in a kiln for 4 days, after which the fire and baked lime were extinguished with water, and allowed to cool for 2–3 days more. The baked lime (Arabic: nūreh) was then crushed and mixed with soft, black volcanic cinders known as scoria (Arabic: shāsh), a pumice having the consistency of gravel. The scoria and lime were pounded with a stone to break them down into finer particles and thoroughly mixed together without water (the two ingredients being mixed together in a ratio of two parts of aggregate to one part of lime), and then allowed to rest 3-4 days until settled. Afterwards, the two elements were mixed together with water (usually 1 volume of water to 3 volumes of lime/aggregate), during which time the batch is continuously agitated in a tedious process known as slaking and which required many long hours of manual labour (as much as 4–5 weeks), before a finer lime water solution was added thereto for 1–2 months so as to convert it to a paste. The more that it was pounded with a long shovel or wooden paddle, the more the qadad became adhesive.

== Traditional application ==
With the now ready mixture of lime and volcanic cinders, they would apply three-layers of qadad-plaster to the walls of cisterns to make them impermeable; the first layer having the largest particles of volcanic cinders (scoria) and the least amount of lime was applied to rough stone, the plaster being added to a thickness of about two inches. They took a sharp-edged stone and, for several days, pounded and rubbed the first layer of qadad firmly onto the wall, all the while sprinkling it with lime-water to keep it wet. The second layer was applied after fully working the first layer by beating. The first process was repeated, this time the wall being plastered with a mixture of qadad containing smaller particles of volcanic cinders and more lime. A sharp-edged stone was again used to pound the qadad firmly onto the wall, all the while sprinkling it with lime-water to keep it wet. Finally, the third layer was applied containing the smallest particles of volcanic cinders and the largest quantity of lime and worked with a sharp-edged stone (one part aggregate to two parts lime, and pounded to a fine paste), and lime-water spattered on the wall to maintain its wetness. After the final application, the wall was treated with a very finely-ground consistency of qadad which was allowed to dry, and when dried, an application of animal fat (suet) was then smeared on the wall for smoothing and burnishing. The end result is that of a wall that is as hard as smooth-marble with beating.

According to archaeologist Selma Al-Radi, qadad can only be used as a plaster on buildings constructed of stone and baked brick, but it will not adhere to mudbrick, cement blocks or concrete. In Yemen it was traditionally made with two basic ingredients, baked lime and volcanic scoria, other countries have traditionally made-use of fine riverbed sand or pebbles instead of scoria, and which were mixed together with lime for use as a common mortar, or to be used as an impervious wall plaster.

== Usage ==
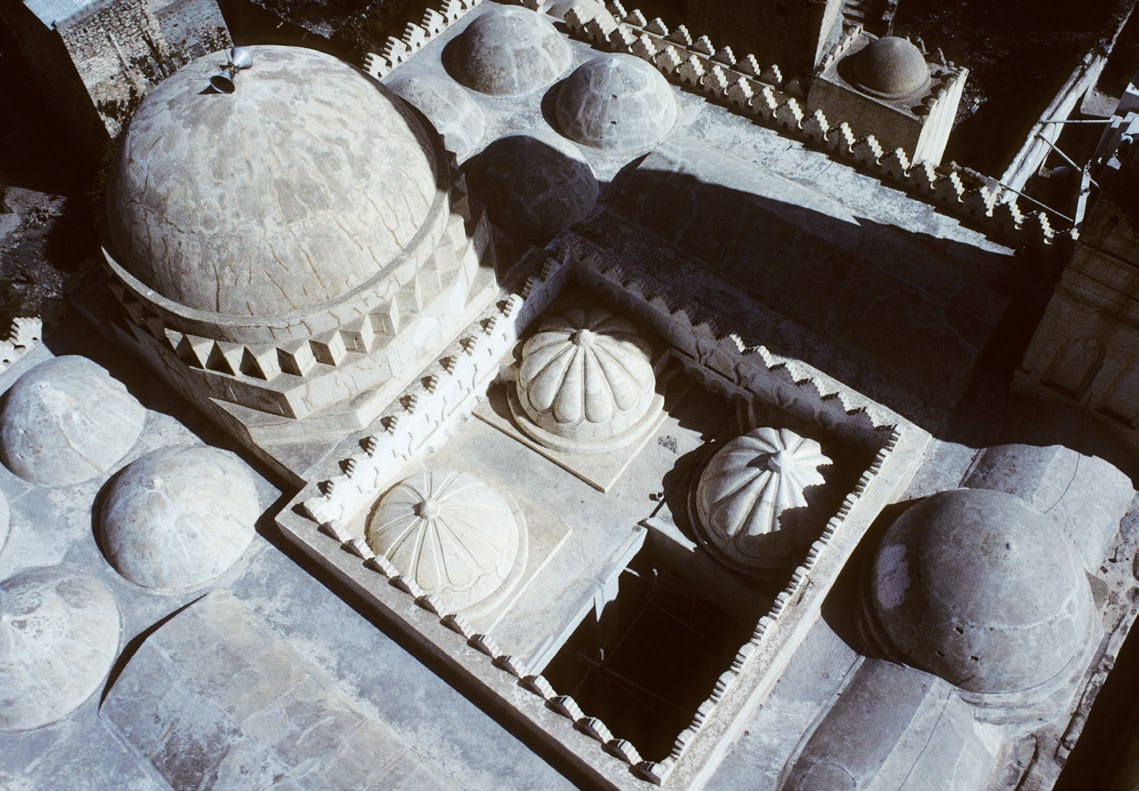
Ashrafiya Mosque in Taiz is covered with Qadad.

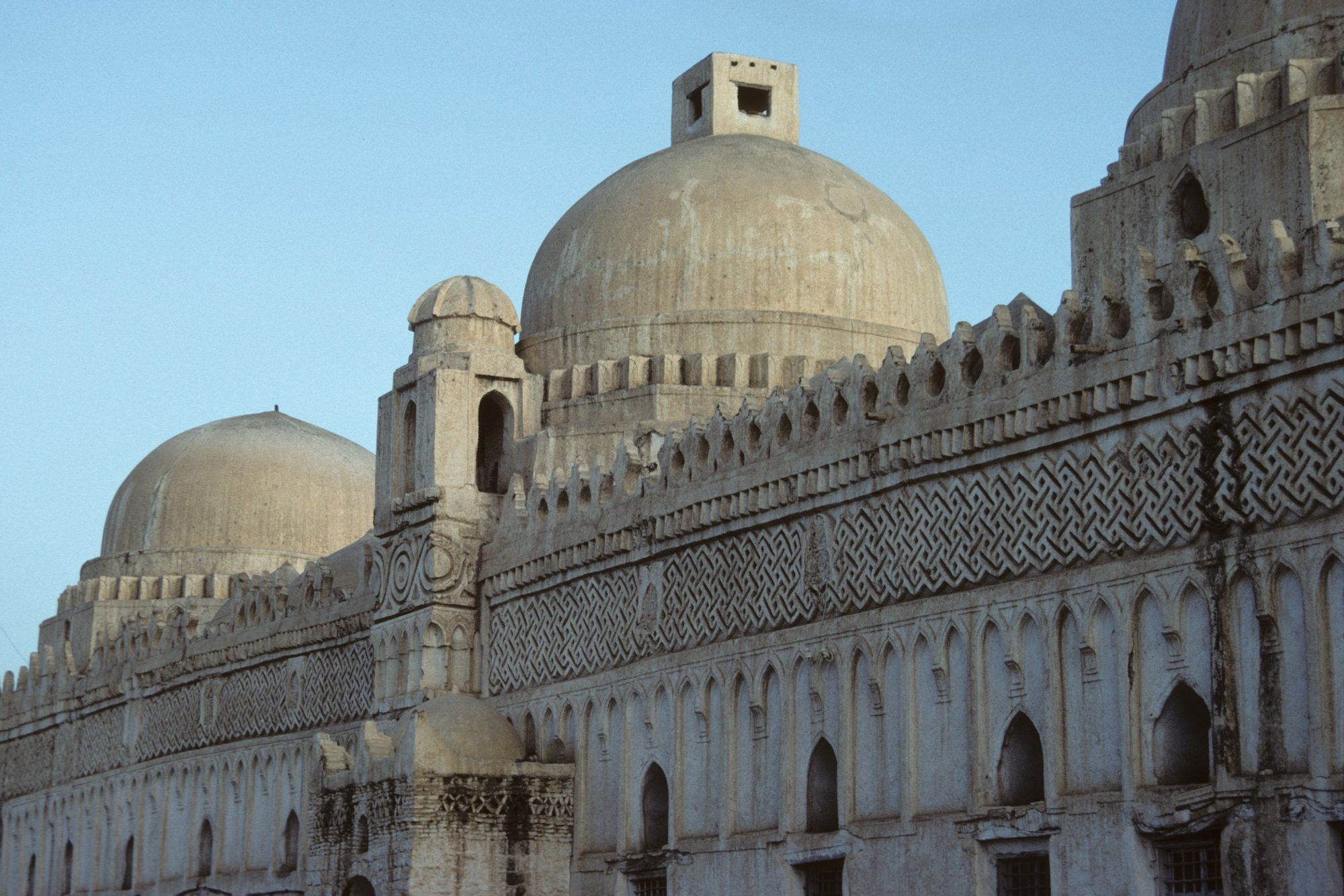
Mudhaffar Mosque in Taiz covered with Qadad

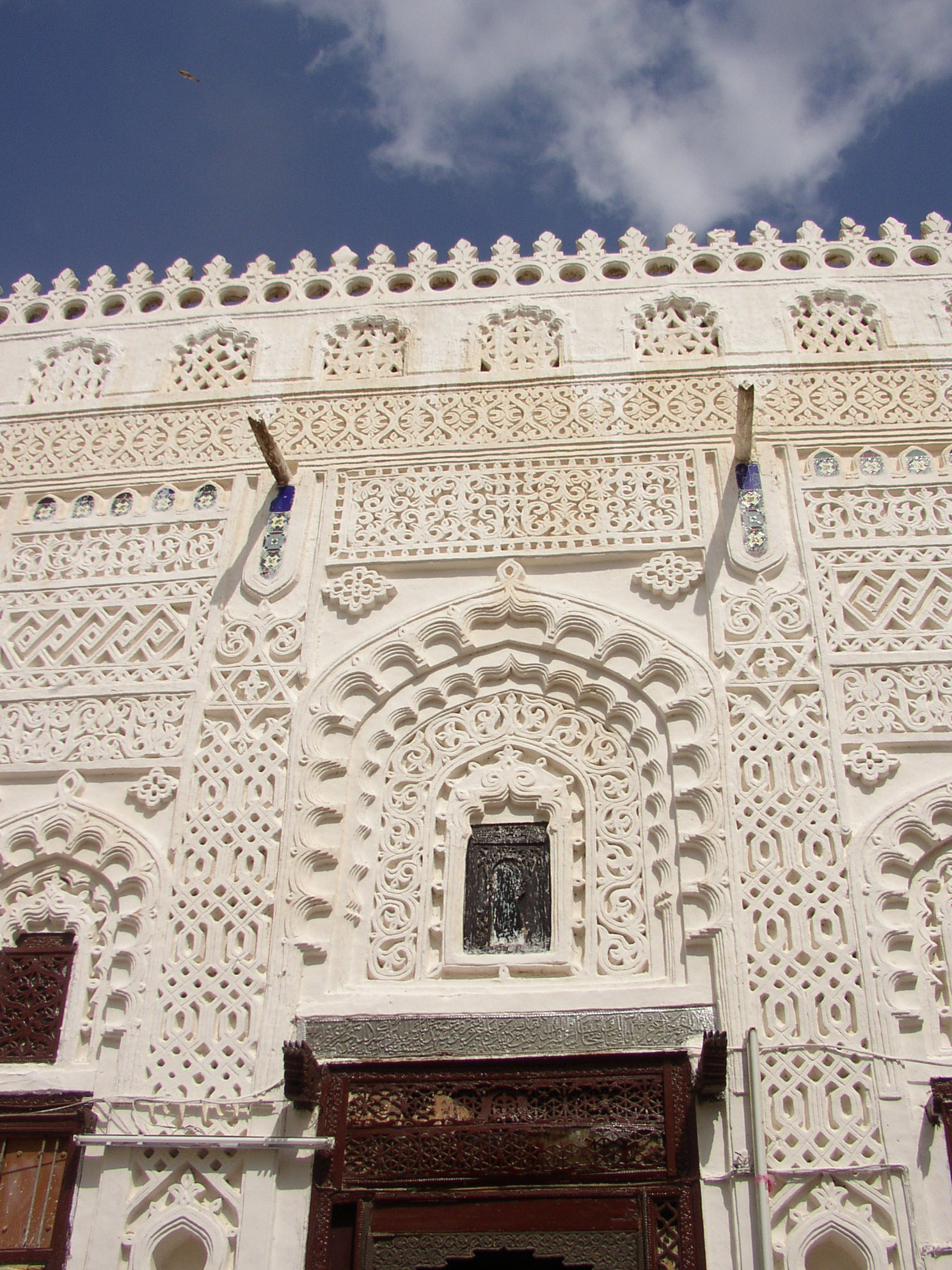
A house in the historic Town of Zabid covered with qadad carved into yeseria

In Sana'a of the early 20th century, qadad-plaster was used to line pools, reservoirs, drainage pipes, and cesspits, and to make them impermeable. After applying the qadad, the coating was burnished with a stone. Often its use extended unto the main kitchen room and to gutters and sinks, wherever water was likely to be used extensively (see also tadelakt). The walls of store-rooms where grain was kept and which required being impervious to water were also frequently painted-over with qadad and which gave to the rooms an appearance of being painted with oil paint. Carl Rathjens, who visited Yemen in the first half of the 20th century, mentions seeing in Sana'a "the houses of well-to-do people" where the entrance halls were often painted with qadad up to a certain height. The interior walls of public baths were sometimes brick, sometimes stone. If brick, they were protected with a thick layer of hard gypsum plaster which were then oil-painted.

In Islamic architecture, different consistencies of qadad were made for different usages: domes, flat ceilings, vertical walls and decorations in the geometric interlace.

== See also ==
- Limepit (old technique used in calcining limestone)
- Lime plaster
- Plasterwork
- Pozzolan
- Tadelakt, a similar waterproof lime-soap plaster
- Sarooj, a similar water-resistant plaster
