= Sarooj =

Type of Iranian mortar

Sarooj is a traditional water-resistant mortar used in Iranian architecture, used in the construction of bridges and yakhchāl, ancient Persian ice houses. It is made of clay and limestone mixed in a six-to-four ratio to make a stiff mix, and kneaded for three days. A portion of furnace slags from baths is combined with cattail (Typha) fibers, egg, and straw, and fixed, then beaten with a wooden stick for even mixing. Egg whites can be used as a water reducer as needed.

Its origin (in Persian: Saru) is lime, i.e. limestone mixed with arsenic.

== History ==
Mosaddad et al. report the use of a mixture consisting of lime, sand and ash in the construction of an 1800-year-old Sasanian bridge-dam on the Karoon river south of Shooshtar. The Sheikh's biogas bath-house in Isfahan featured a water-impermeable sarooj composed of lime, egg white, and bamboo dust.

Another alternative formulation used for yakhchāl and water tanks in Iran uses "sand, clay, egg whites, lime, goat hair, and ash in specific proportions." All of these examples utilize pozzolanic properties and/or incorporate biopolymerization to increase the durability and impermeability of the plaster.

Soak the soil for at least two weeks with water. The water should be free of impurities and suitable for drinking.

== See also ==
- Qadad, another preindustrial waterproof plaster
- Tadelakt, another waterproof lime soap plaster
