= Lath =

Narrow strip of wood as a base for plaster

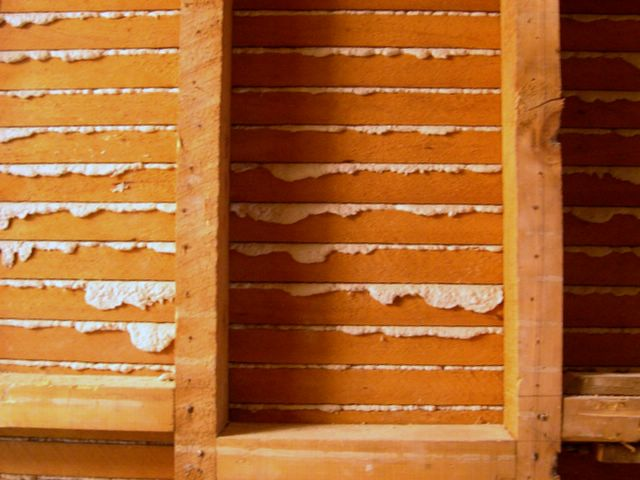
Sawn lath, seen from the back with hardened plaster from the other side showing through. Sawn lath became popular after the introduction of the circular saw in the 19th century.

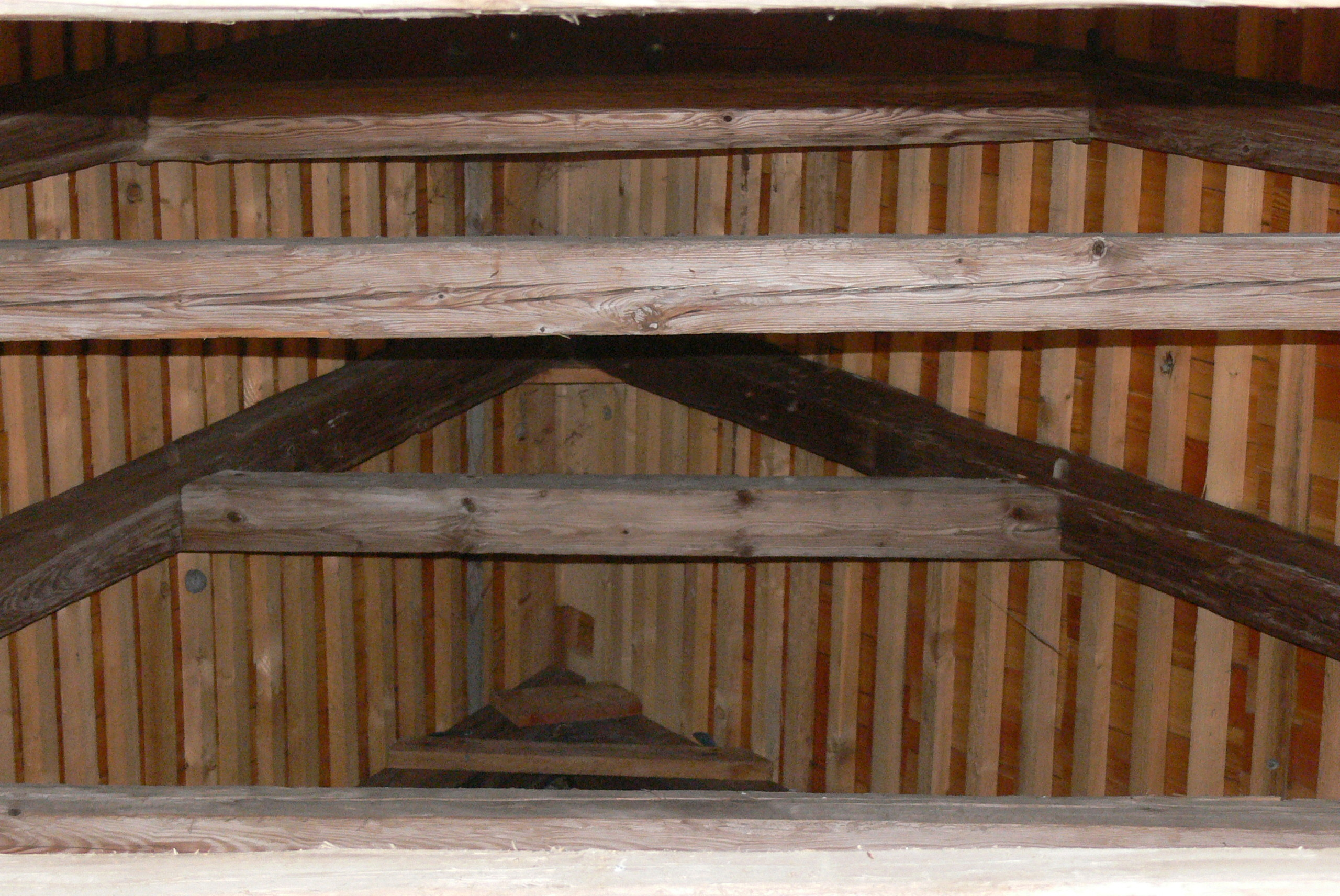
Roof laths span across between the rafters and support the wood shingles.

A lath or slat is a thin, narrow strip of straight-grained wood used under roof shingles or tiles, on lath and plaster walls and ceilings to hold plaster, and in lattice and trellis work.

Lath has expanded to mean any type of backing material for plaster. This includes metal wire mesh or expanded metal that is applied to a wood or metal framework as matrix over which stucco or plaster is applied, as well as drywall products called gypsum or rock lath. Historically, reed mat was also used as a lath material.

One of the key elements of lath, whether wooden slats or wire mesh, are the openings or gaps that allow plaster or stucco to ooze behind and form a mechanical bond to the lath. This is not necessary for gypsum lath, which relies on a chemical bond.

== Etymology ==
The word lath is recorded from the late 13th century and is likely derived from the Old English word *læððe, a variant of lætt. This in turn would seem to stem from a Proto-Germanic word *laþþo, from which have sprung words in many Germanic languages, e.g. Dutch lat, German Latte. The root has also found its way into Romance languages, cf. Italian latta, French latte. The related German word Laden (Middle High German: lade) denotes a board, plank, sash, shutter, counter and hence also a shop.

== Types of lath ==
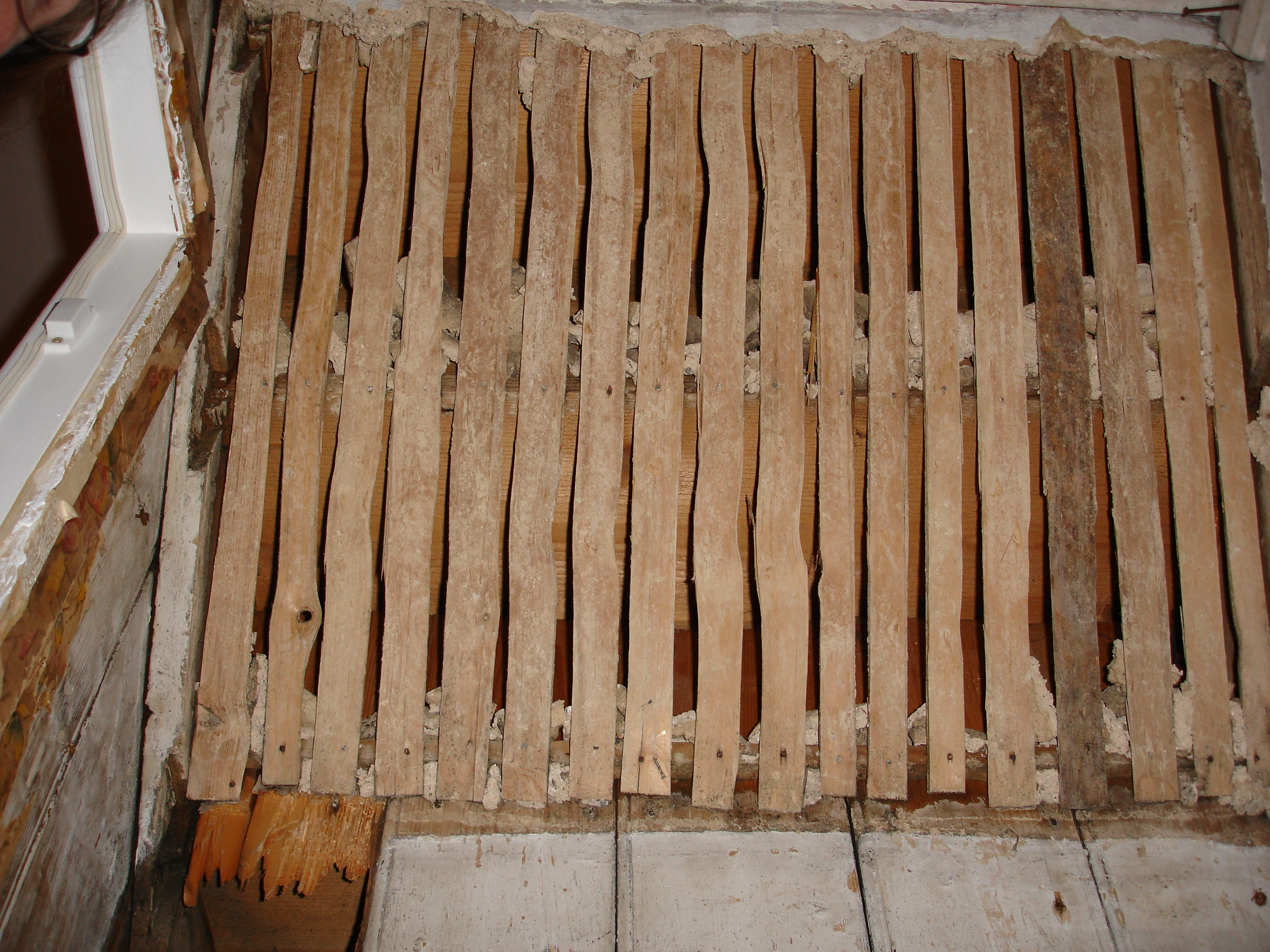
Riven lath, each piece has been split from a log

=== Wooden ===
Wooden-slat laths are still used today in building construction to form a base or groundwork for plaster, but modern lath and plaster applications are mostly limited to conservation projects.

Tiles, slates, and other coverings on roofs and walls are often fastened to laths, sometimes also called battens or slats. Such strips of wood are also employed to form lattice-work, or are used as the bars of Venetian blinds, and window shutters. Lath is also used on many tobacco farms in the Connecticut Valley as a means to carry and hang the plant in barns. This is achieved by using one of two methods: hooking or spearing. A "spear" lath is a regular lath that is held in an upright position. A worker then mounts a spear on top and "spears" the tobacco onto the lath. The other form of lath is called "hook" lath, which has small hooks attached that allows workers to hook the stems of tobacco plants onto the lath, often between two lengths of twine attached to the lath and twisted mechanically.

A lathhouse is an open structure roofed with laths in order to grow plants which need shelter from the sun.

Laths were also used to fix reeds to a timber structure before plastering.

In Cape Cod, laths were used in the early 1880s for building wooden lobster traps.

Historically there were three ways of making wood lath for plaster: riven lath, accordion lath, and circular sawn lath. Riven lath was traditionally split with the grain from chestnut, oak, and similar hardwoods, or from softwoods like eastern white pine. Individual laths were riven and nailed in place. Because they are split with the grain, riven lath is stronger than later forms of lath production. Accordion laths are thin, sawn boards that are partially split with a hatchet or axe. The splits are then spread apart to form gaps for the plaster to key into. The name derived from the spreading action, which is like pulling an accordion open. After the circular saw came into use in the early 19th century, lath for plastering was sawn in sawmills and delivered to the building site. Ihe 1930s to 1940s the use of lath and plaster was replaced with plasterboard, which was cheaper and easier to use.

=== Counter-lath ===
Counter-lath is a term used in roofing and plastering for a piece of wood placed perpendicular to the lath. In roofing, a counter-lath is a slight piece of timber parallel with and between common rafters to give the lath extra support, or a lath placed by eye between every two gauged ones. When plastering, sometimes a counter-lath is placed perpendicular to the lath as a fillet (a thin, narrow strip of material) to space the lath off of the surface to allow the plaster to pass through the lath and create a key.

=== Metal lath ===
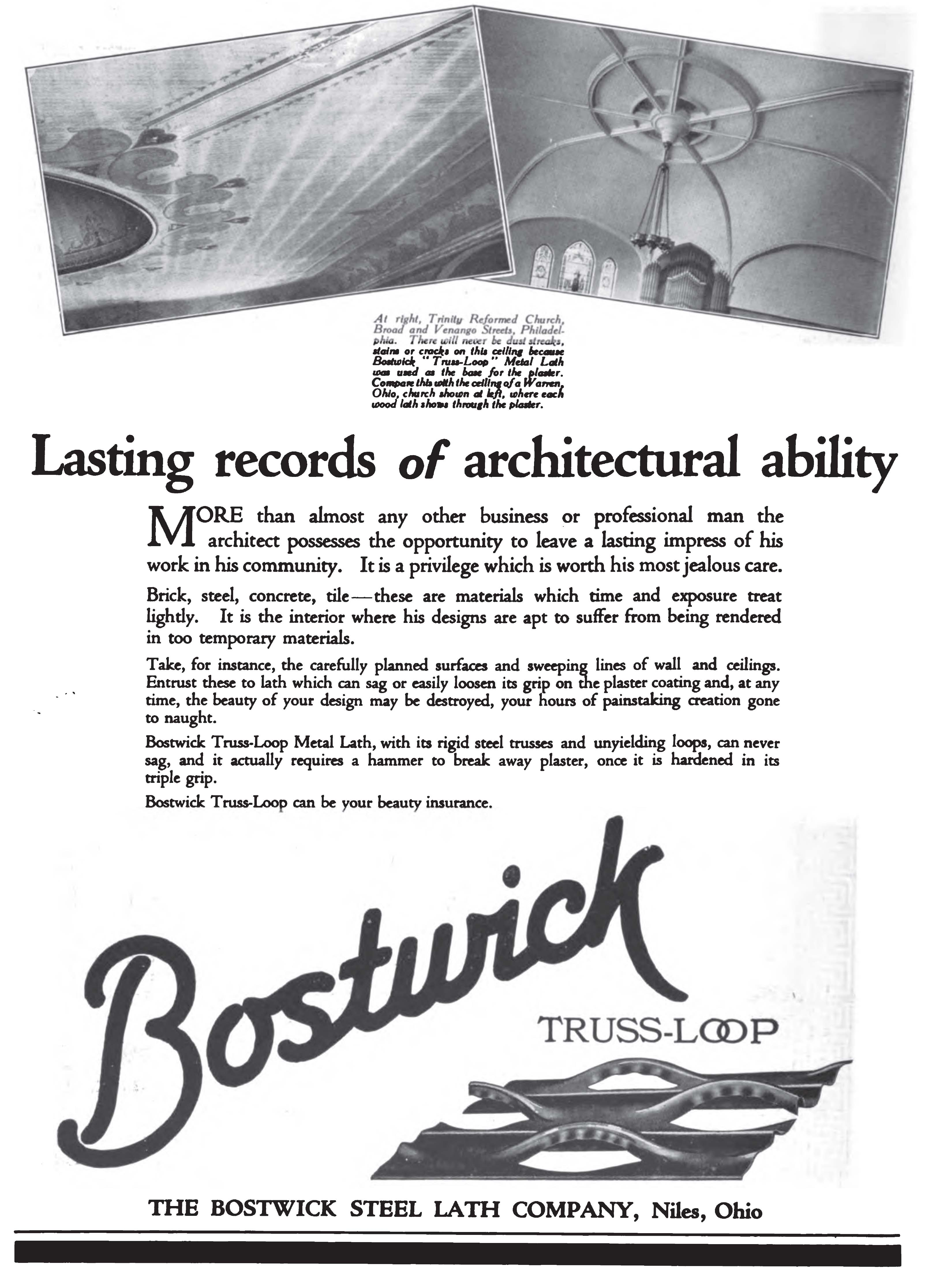
Bostwick Steel Lath Company advertisement for steel truss loop type metal lath in 1920

Metal lath dates from the late 19th century and is used extensively today with plaster and stucco in home and commercial construction. In addition to providing a matrix to which the stucco can adhere, metal lath adds strength and rigidity. . Metal lath can be stapled directly to studs, and is capable of bending to easily form corners and curves. Three coats of plaster are required when using metal lath.

Several types of metal lath have been developed for a variety of applications:

- Expanded metal lath is made by slitting and pulling apart a thin sheet of metal, which produces diamond-shape holes through which the plaster can form keys.
- Ribbed lath is made from slit and expanded metal with V-shaped ribs which give it more stiffness, and is designed to span larger distance between framing supports
- Self-furring lath is an expanded metal lath which is dimpled to hold itself off from a solid surface
- Wire lath is made from welded or woven wires and is similar to hardware cloth
- Paper backed wire lath is wire lath with building paper attached
- Strip laths is metal lath that is several inches wide and is often used to reinforce joints and on corners
- Corner lath is pre-bent for use in making corners
- Wire mesh used on inside corners to prevent cracking is called Cornerite.

=== Gypsum lath ===
Gypsum lath (rock lath) consists of gypsum plaster sandwiched between two sheets of absorbent paper. The finish side (to which plaster is trawled) is treated with gypsum crystals for the plaster to chemically bond to and is sometimes perforated to allow mechanical bonding. It is commonly used in place of wood lath since it is noncombustible, easy to use, and can give better results. Gypsum board can be purchased in sheets of various sizes and screwed or nailed directly onto a building's studs. Due to its rigidity, it is most suited for use on straight walls.

Gypsum board was improved in 1910 by the paper wrapping the edges and multiple variations were developed in the 1930s. Gypsum lath is available with a foil facing, which acts as a vapor barrier and heat reflector, and as a veneer base for plaster veneer.

== Keys ==
Keys are formed by plaster that oozes through the spaces or gaps between wooden lath, or the holes in metal lath, and around to the lath's back side. This secures the plaster to the lath by creating a sort of hook. Wooden and metal lath depend on the mechanical bond created by keys to adhere the plaster to the lath.

== Framing ==
Lath can be attached directly to the frame of a building, such as the studs of a timber structure. Alternatively, lath can be attached to a timber or metal frame called a furring, which is then attached to the building structure. Furrings are often used in masonry construction. Frames are also used when using lath and plaster to create decorative, curved, or ornamental work.

== Lath failure ==
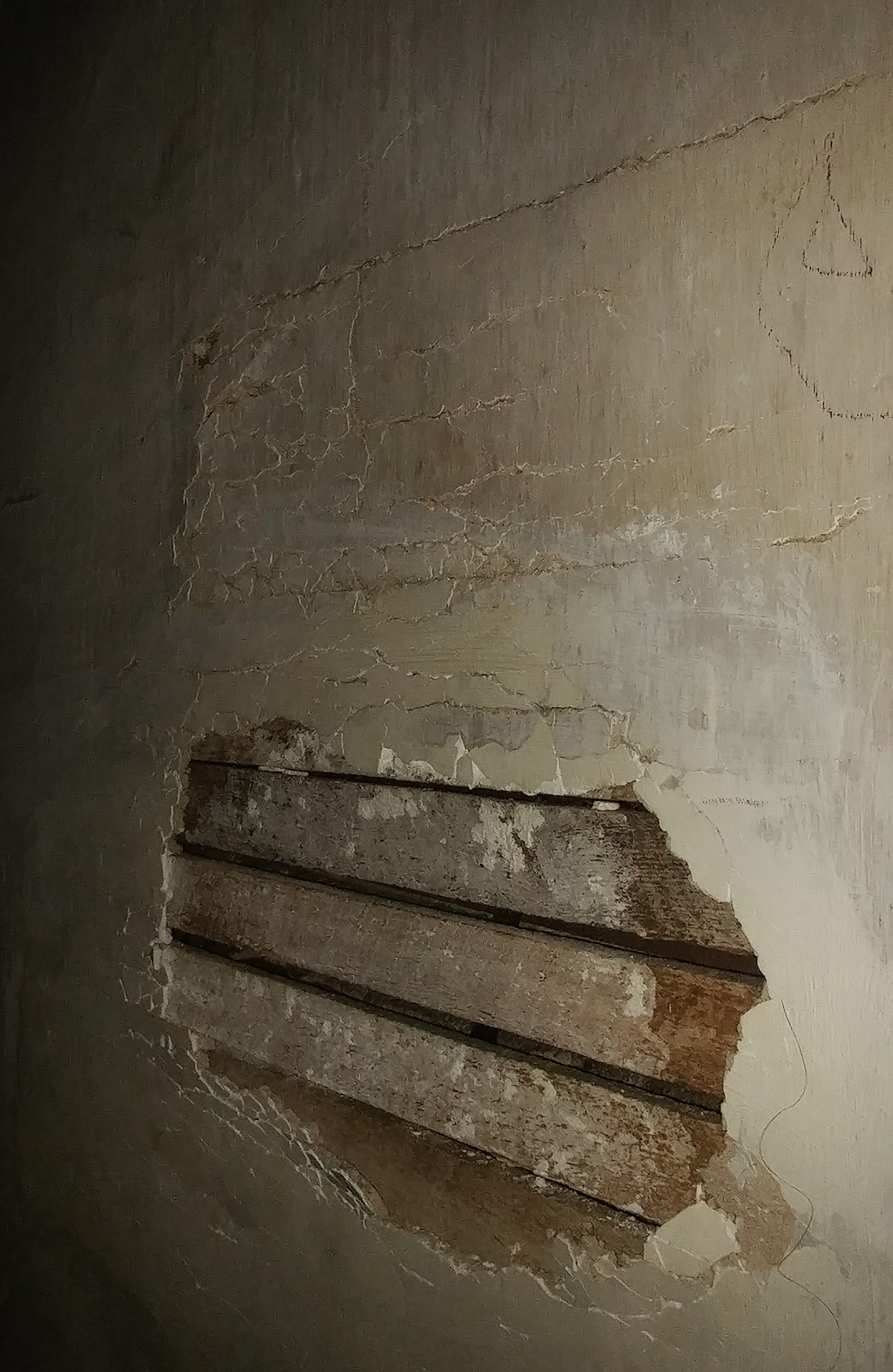
Lath with sections of failing and failed sections

There are several reasons that a plaster and lath wall may fail. First, the lath itself can sometimes pull away from the frame on which it is mounted. This is generally due to the use of non-galvanized nails. The lath can also fail because of decay from moisture or insect damage. Moisture can also cause wooden lath to expand and contract, causing the plaster around it to crack.

Additionally, failure can also occur in the plaster keys. Over time, the keys can deteriorate and crack, weakening their ability to hold the plaster onto the lath. The addition of hair in plaster helps to prevent this by adding strength. Problems can also occur in the keys if they were not properly formed to begin with, which can happen when laths are set too close together for plaster to travel though. Key failure often manifests as looseness and sagging in walls or ceilings, and in worst cases can lead to plaster breakage and collapse.

=== Repair methods ===
Repairing damaged lath and plaster walls is generally more economical than replacing it. Often, the plaster needs the repairs, and not the lath itself. As long as the lath and the first coats (brown coat) of plaster do not have any significant damage, minor cracks can simply be patched. For larger cracks, and when the brown coat is damaged, several base coats need to be applied prior to the patch coat. Metal lath can also be added to wooden lath prior to coating to add strength and increase keying.

If the back side of the lath is accessible, it is possible to create new keys where they have failed. This is most often done by conservators when one wants to maintain the original finished surface of the wall or ceiling. After bracing the failing plaster in place, a bonding agent and a plaster are applied to the back of the laths and forced through the gaps to the back side of the original plaster.

== Benefits of lath ==
Lath and plaster walls have several benefits, including fire and mold resistance, soundproofing, and heat insulation. Though wooden lath can be susceptible to mold growth and decay, metal lath covered in plaster creates an environment that is inhospitable to toxic molds. Metal lath and plaster walls can be twice as resistant to fire as drywall, and are capable of achieving a two-hour fire rating with a 2-inch-thick (5.1 cm) assembly. Two inches of plaster and lath can also achieve the same decibel rating as 4 7/8 inches (12 cm) of drywall.

== See also ==
- Garden trellis
- Lath art
- Lattice truss bridge
- Plasterwork § Laths
