= Expanded metal =

Building material

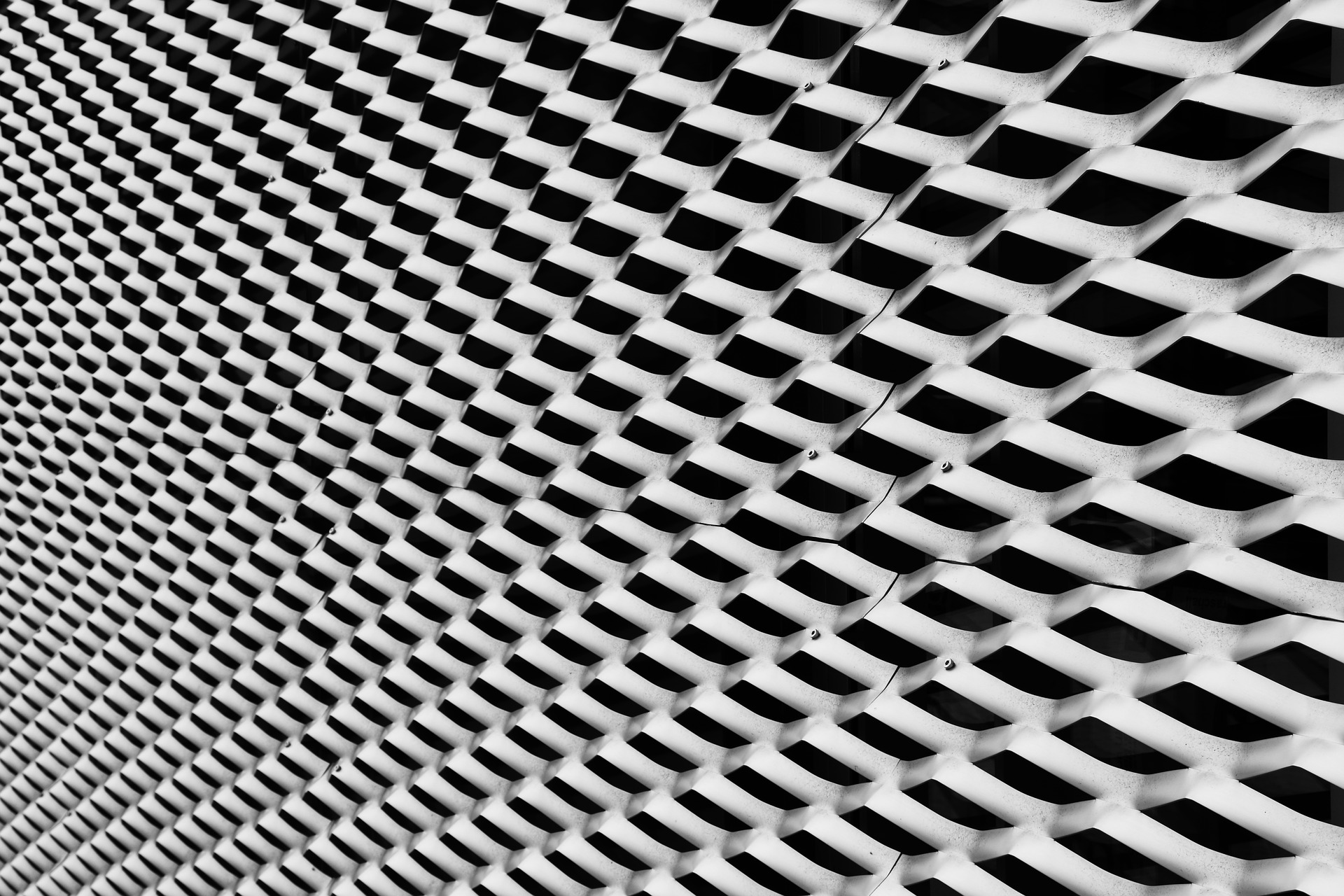
Sheet of expanded metal

Expanded metal is a type of sheet metal which has been cut and stretched to form a regular pattern (often diamond-shaped) of mesh-like material. It is commonly used for fences and grates, and as metallic lath to support plaster or stucco.

== Description ==
Expanded metal is stronger than an equivalent weight of wire mesh such as chicken wire, because the material is flattened, allowing the metal to stay in one piece. The other benefit to expanded metal is that the metal is never completely cut and reconnected, allowing the material to retain its strength.

== History ==
The inventor and patentee of expanded metal is John French Golding, whose first British patent was issued in 1884. He forged partnerships with Hartlepool industrialists Mathew Gray, Christopher Furness and Robert Irving Jr., who, together with W.B Close, brought the manufacture of expanded metal to Hartlepool. The Expanded Metal Company Limited of Hartlepool, United Kingdom, remains a manufacturer of expanded metal to this day and is one of the largest employers locally.

== Design ==
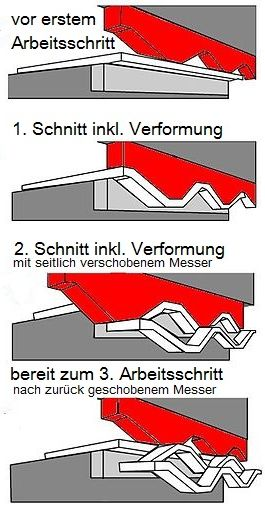
Formation of one type of expanded metal

Some commonly used shapes are circles, squares, and diamonds; diamonds are the most popular shapes because of how well the shape absorbs energy and resists mechanical deformation after installation. Other design considerations are the size and angles of the shapes, which will also affect how well the metal absorbs energy and where the energy is spread throughout the expanded metal.

For the diamond shape, there are at least four different angles that come into account, the two acute and two obtuse angles. The larger the angles, the less strength the shape will have because there would be too much space inside the shape. However, if the angles are too small, strength is lost because the shape is too close together, so there is no space for the structure to hold.

The angle in which the shapes are laid also plays a significant role. If the angle is zero, the ends of the shape point to the start and the end of the sheet, making straight lines across the sheet of diamonds. This option provides the most strength when it comes to compressing the sheet on its side. This can even take more pressure than a solid piece of metal because the sheet will compress and spread the pressure throughout the sheet. The other four commonly used angles are 60°, 90°, 90° plus 60°, and 60° plus 90°. A 60° angle puts the diamond diagonal at the start and end to the sheet. A 90° angle makes the diamond vertical to the start and the end of a sheet. The 90° plus 60° and 60° plus 90° angles combine both a 60° angle and a 90° angle; the order of the angles is respective to the order in naming. The expanded metal can be manufactured and supplied as standard mesh; or it can be flattened by further levelling processes to have a smooth surface, which allows usage of mesh in more applications, such as prisons, as it no longer has sharp edges that could cause injury.

== Applications ==
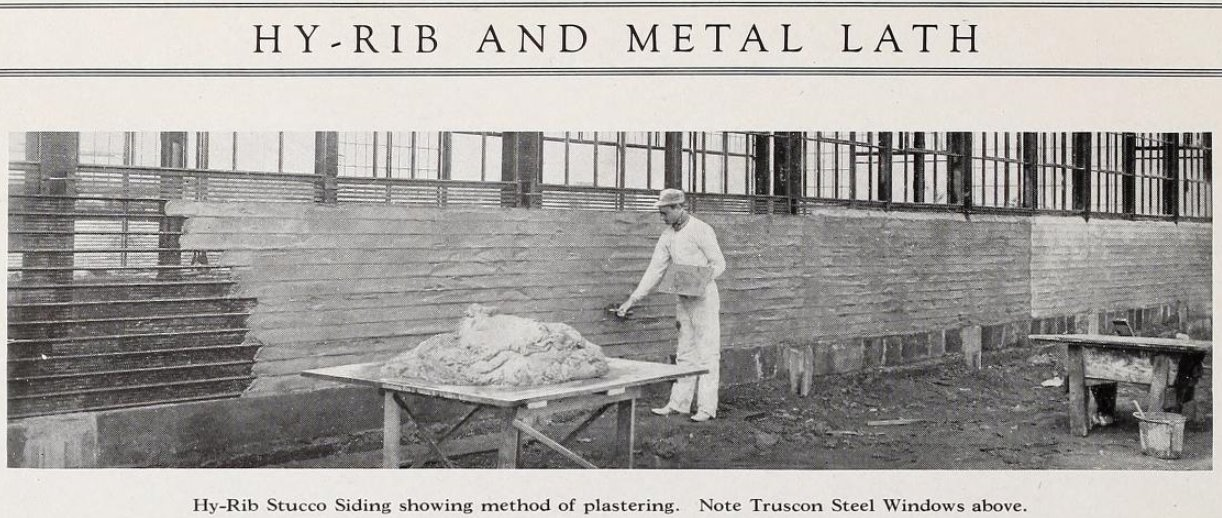
Expanded metal lath used to support stucco (1919)

Expanded metal is frequently used to make fences, walkways, and grates, as the material is very durable and strong, unlike lighter and less expensive wire mesh. The many small openings in the material allow flow through of air, water, and light, while still providing a mechanical barrier to larger objects. Another advantage to using expanded metal as opposed to plain sheet metal is that the exposed edges of the expanded metal provide more traction, which has led to its use in catwalks or drainage covers.

Large quantities of expanded metal are used by the construction industry as metal lath to support materials such as plaster, stucco, or adobe in walls and other structures.

Expanded metal is also used by artists, especially sculptors, who use the material to form complex 3-dimensional surfaces and compound curves which can then be covered with plaster, clay, or other materials. For example, Niki de Saint Phalle made extensive use of expanded metal to support the curved surfaces of large-scale architectural sculptures in her Tarot Garden sculpture garden, in Tuscany, Italy.

A similar material made of stiff sheets of paper or cardboard is used as a low-cost cushioning and packaging material.

In contemporary architecture, expanded metal has been used as an exposed facade or screen material which can be formed into simple or complex decorative shapes. Photographic images may be printed on the surface, producing textures or large graphic images, which still allow light to filter through the exterior surface of a building.

== Architectural applications ==
When the New Museum in New York City started winning awards for its expanded metal facade in 2021, expanded metal has seen a resurgence as an architectural design element. There are growing uses for it as second facade skin, ceilings, interior cladding, signage, retail design, parking garage screens, equipment screens, and more.

Using these materials as a sunshade is a functional application where the mesh is used to create shade inside the building reducing the heat gain inside and thus reducing energy consumption and carbon.

== Safety ==
Freshly-cut expanded metal has a large number of exposed sharp edges, requiring caution and protective clothing, such as leather gloves and aprons to prevent skin abrasions and cuts.
