= Charles Johnson Farm =

Historic farm in Indiana, US

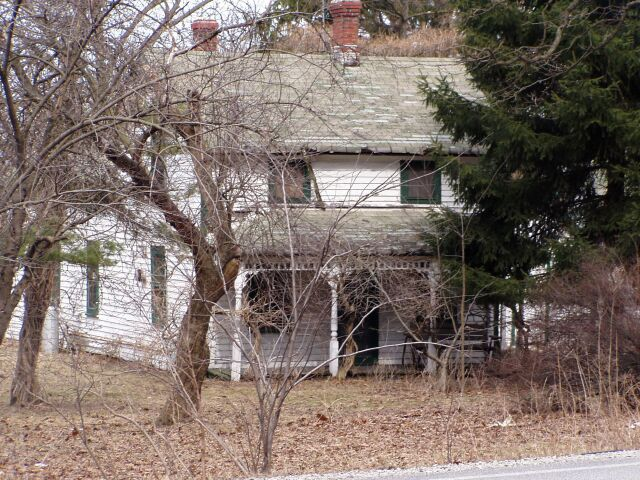
Charles Johnson Farm House, 217 Dunes Highway, Porter, Indiana

Charles Johnson purchased 6.78 acres (2.74 ha) from a Charles Anderson, who was living in a log cabin on the site since about 1880. When Johnson purchased the property in 1904, that cabin was the only structure, along with an orchard to the southwest of the main house. One of the Johnsons' daughters regularly went to this farm to purchase apples. When Mr. Anderson suggested that he give her the tree, she became adamant that her parents move it. Since that was not possible, Mr. Johnson asked if he could purchase the property, to which Mr. Anderson replied that he would sell, if the Johnsons built him a place back in the woods to live out his life.

Historic structures

- In 1908, the cabin enlarged into the main house seen today. It was enclosed by clapboard siding and the inside was lath and plastered. It was enlarged with a dining room and kitchen. Because the house was expanded from and existing structure, there are no identifiable Swedish characteristics.
- There are two summer kitchens to the east of the house. The smallest (8 ft × 12 ft or 2.4 m × 3.7 m) was built as a temporary structure during the 1908 improvement of the main house. The other (12 ft × 20 ft or 3.7 m × 6.1 m) was the house built by the Johnsons for Charles Anderson. It was moved nearer the farmstead after his death.
- Northeast of the main house is the two-story barn (12 ft × 30 in or 3.7 m × 760 mm). The barn was built sometime before 1908. A chicken coop was added shortly after the barns construction.
- the privy is still standing to the northeast of the main house about 50 feet (15 m).
