= Chicken wire (chemistry) =

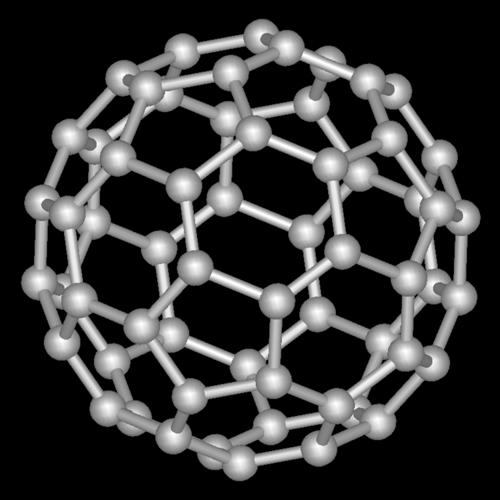
Buckminsterfullerene "Bucky ball" with a chicken wire-like chemical structure

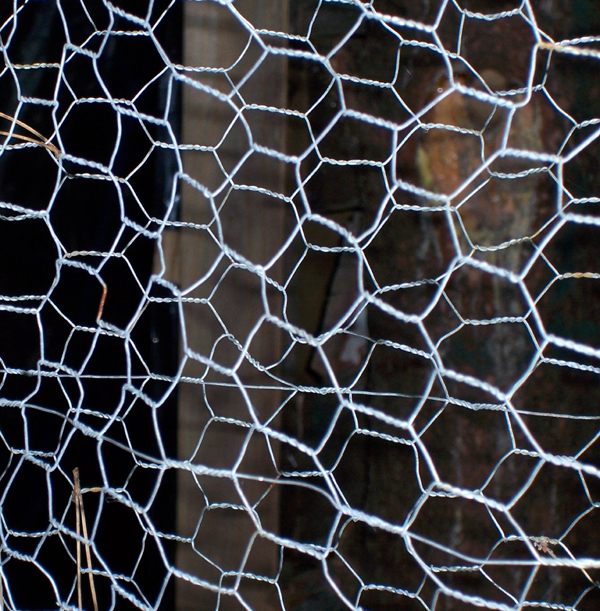
Chicken wire

In chemistry, the term chicken wire is used in different contexts. Most of them relate to the similarity of the regular hexagonal (honeycomb-like) patterns found in certain chemical compounds to the mesh structure commonly seen in real chicken wire.

== Examples ==
=== Polycyclic aromatic hydrocarbons ===
Polycyclic aromatic hydrocarbons or graphenes—including fullerenes, carbon nanotubes, and graphite—have a hexagonal structure that is often described as chicken wire-like.

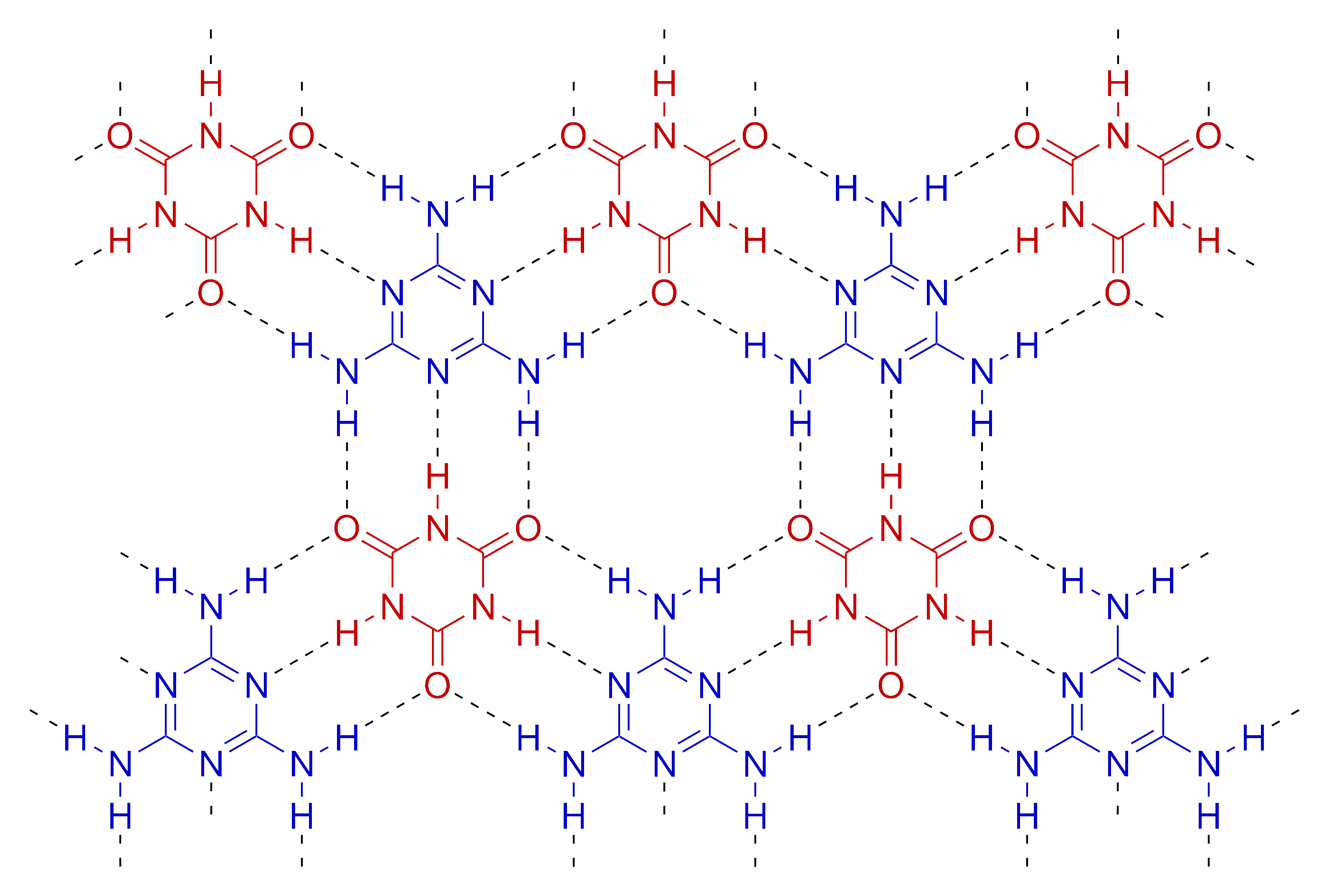
Hydrogen bonded (dashed) complex between melamine (blue) and cyanuric acid (red)

=== Hexagonal molecular structures ===
A hexagonal structure that is often described as chicken wire-like can also be found in other types of chemical compounds such as:

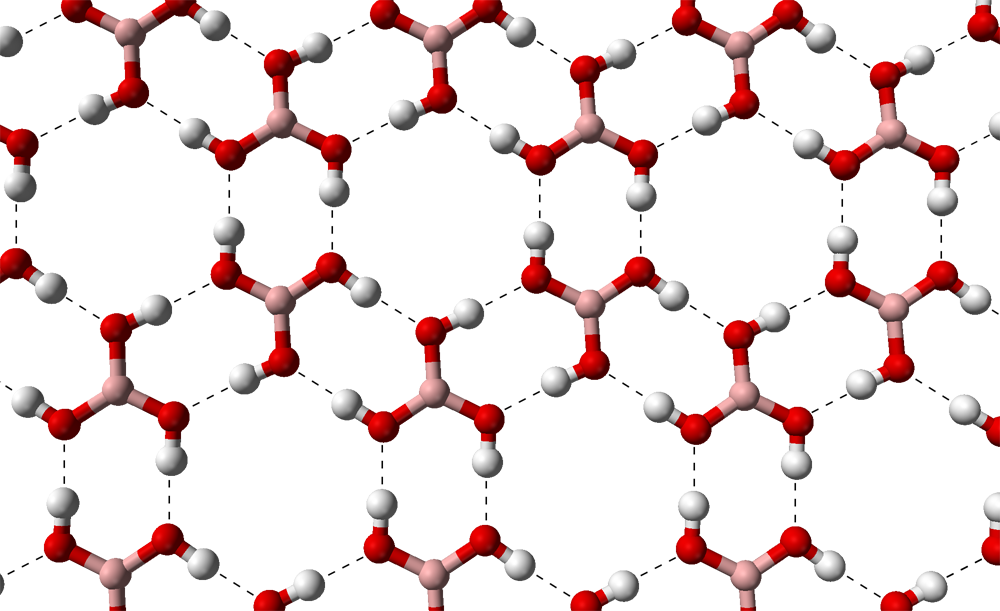
Hydrogen-bonded "chicken wire" of boric acid.

- Non-aromatic polycyclic hydrocarbons, e.g. steroids like cholesterol
- Flat hexagonal hydrogen bonded trimesic acid (benzene-1,3,5-tricarboxylic acid), boric acid, or melamine-cyanuric acid complexes
- Interwoven molecule chains in the inorganic polymer NaAuS
- Complexes of the protein clathrin

Phenanthrene drawn in "chicken wire notation"

== Additional information ==
=== Bond line notation ===
The skeletal formula is a method to draw structural formulas of organic compounds where lines represent the chemical bonds and the vertices represent implicit carbon atoms. This notation is sometimes called chicken wire notation by a Stanford professor.

Chemical structure of the fictional molecule 1,35-dimethyl-chickenwire

=== Chemical joke ===
It is an old joke in chemistry to draw a polycyclic hexagonal chemical structure and call this fictional compound chickenwire. By adding one or two simple chemical groups to this skeleton, the compound can then be named following the official chemical naming convention. An example is 1,2-Dimethyl-chickenwire in a cartoon by Nick D. Kim.

A "chicken wire surface plot" of n,n-Dimethyltryptamine

=== Surface plots ===
In computational chemistry a chicken wire model or chicken wire surface plot is a way to visualize molecular models by drawing the polygon mesh of their surface (defined e.g. as the van der Waals radius or a certain electron density).
