= Pomping =

Homecoming tradition at some U.S. universities

Pomping is a tradition associated with homecoming at some universities in the Southern United States, such as the University of Alabama or Oklahoma State University. The term refers to the act of creating lawn decorations or floats out of pomps, or wads of colored tissue paper placed in chicken wire. It is typically associated with Greek life, and sororities may compete to win the lawn decoration contest.

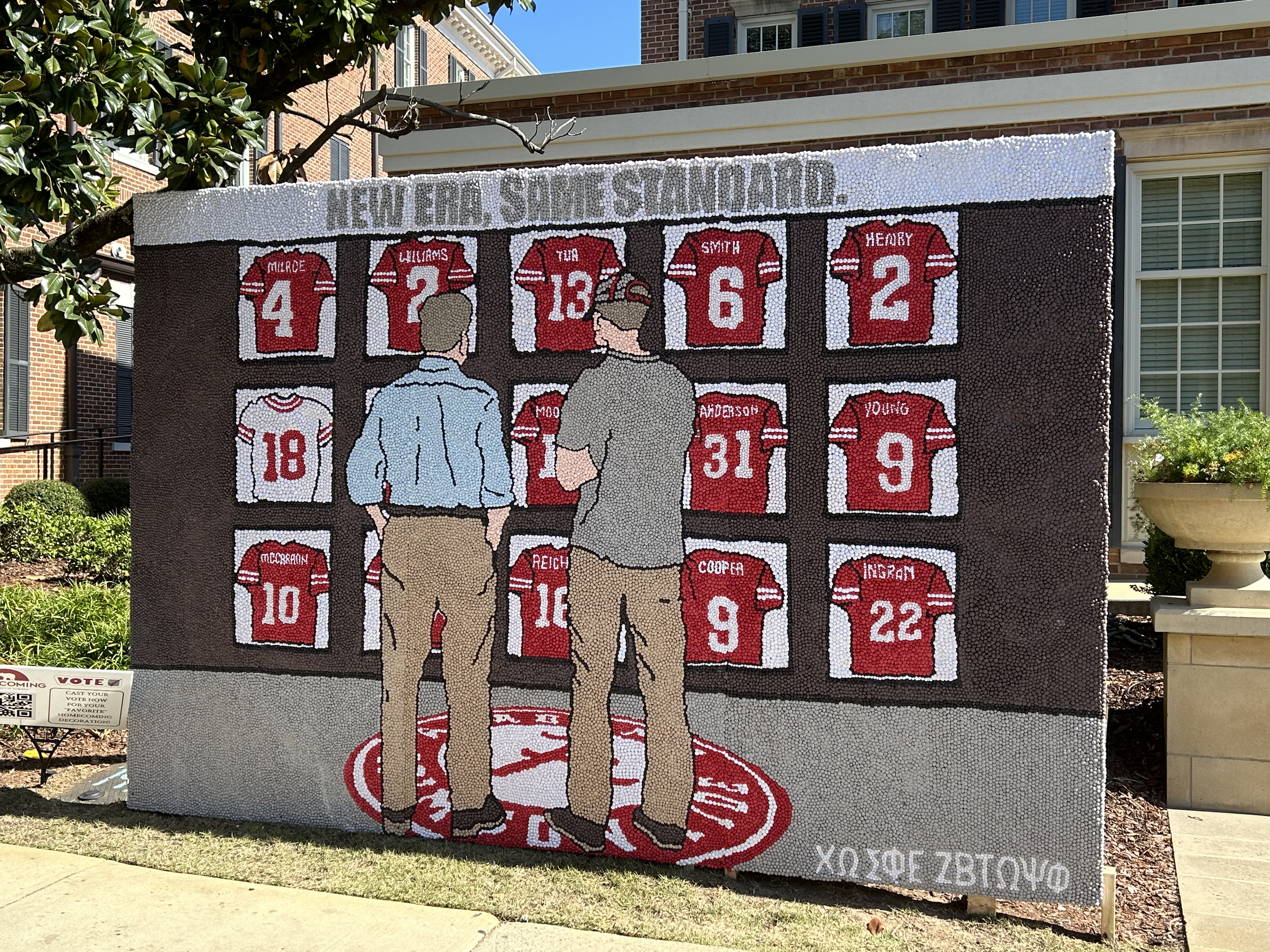
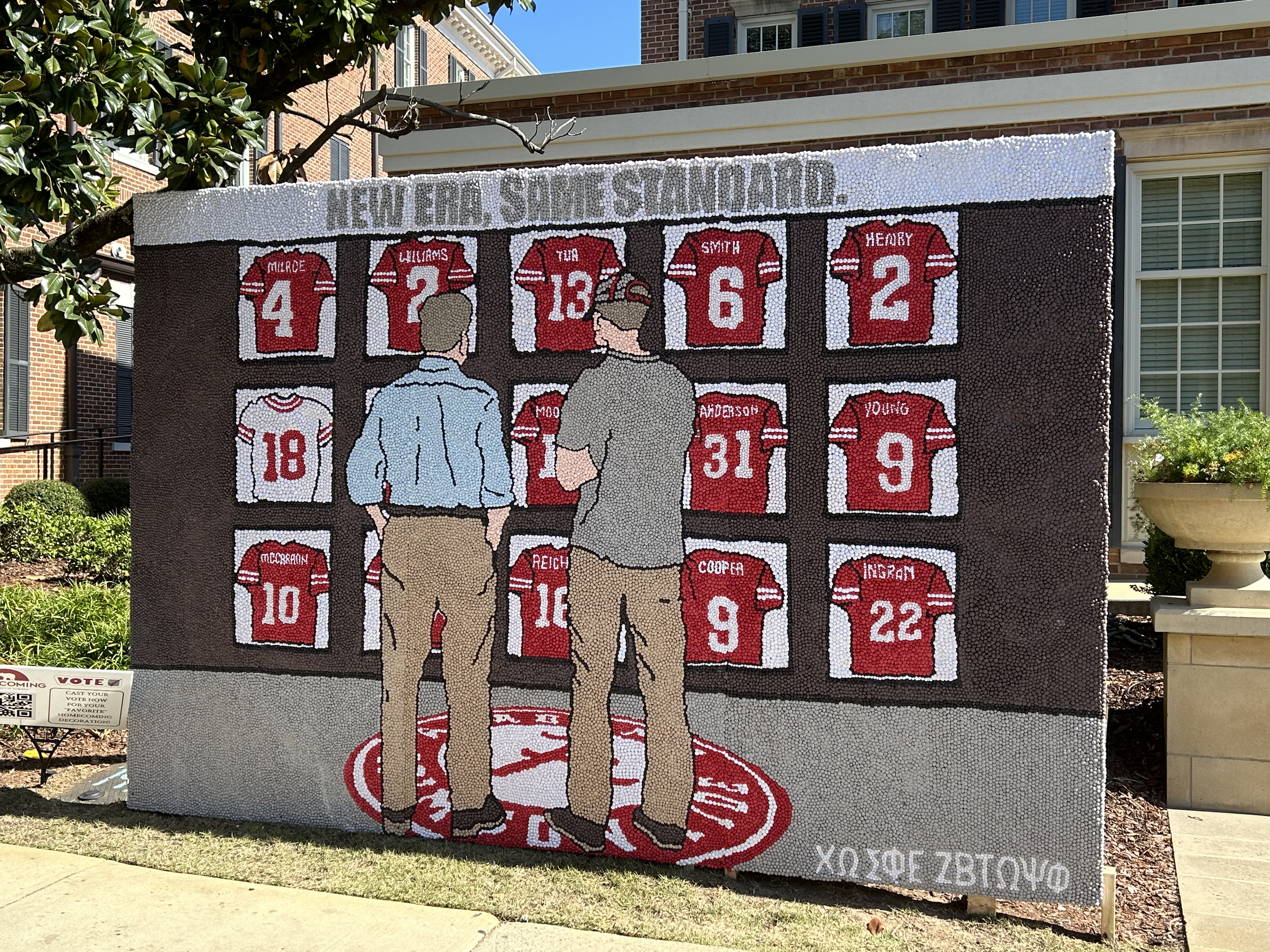
Top: A lawn display made by pomping at the University of Alabama
Bottom: The image zoomed in to show the individual pomps

== Origins ==
Pomping is documented in newspaper articles dating back to the 1930s. The tradition originally began when sororities started decorating their front doors for homecoming events. Following World War II, the practice grew significantly in popularity and evolved from simple door decorations into building massive, elaborate house decks and parade floats.

== Process ==
Designs are planned in the weeks proceeding homecoming. At the University of Alabama, the tissue paper is individually rolled into small balls. At Oklahoma State University, the tissue paper is pushed into the chicken wire without rolling, which allows for larger lawn decorations to be made in the same amount of time. At the University of Tennessee, pomps are used to decorate floats in addition to lawn decorations.
