= Plaster veneer =

Technique for surfacing interior walls

Unpainted plaster veneer.

Plaster veneer (American English) or plaster skim (British English) is a construction methodology for surfacing interior walls, by applying a thin layer of plaster over a substrate—typically over specially formulated gypsum board base, similar in nature to drywall.

== History ==
Until the mid twentieth century, it was standard practice in Western construction to surface interior walls using wooden lath and a layer of plaster about a half-inch thick ("lath and plaster"). Later, drywall became a standard. Typically, drywall is surfaced using the "mud-and-tape" method, where non-adhesive paper or mesh tape and drywall joint compound ("mud") is used to fill joints, cover nail heads, and repair any flaws.

Plaster veneer was developed as a way of taking advantage of the reduced labor of modern drywall, while providing a genuine plaster surface for a wall.

== Applications ==
Unpainted, tinted plaster veneer.

In much of the world, plaster veneer is a very rare wall surface. Consequently, it can be difficult to find a local trade worker skilled in the practice. However, in some regions, such as Ireland, or Massachusetts this situation is reversed, with plaster veneer a common standard, and mud-and-tape the less common alternative.

Plaster veneer is well-suited to the renovation of older buildings, since it is an easier option than full re-creation of the original lath and plaster. The veneer surface will closely mimic antique walls, with their hand-applied variations. In contrast, properly finished mud-and-tape drywall can be very planar, and industrially uniform in character. Drywall feels relatively warm and soft to the touch, while plaster feels cooler and very hard. Consequently, plaster veneer might be an appropriate choice in the renovation of an older house with existing lath-and-plaster walls.

Bare mud-and-tape drywall is generally only acceptable as a final decorating finish in utility spaces such as attics or garages. In most rooms, such walls are finished with paint or wallpaper. Plaster veneer walls are usually similarly decorated, but unpainted plaster can also serve as a finish. Because bare plaster can be appealing to the touch, and paint would add an additional layer, some decorators opt to leave exposed plaster in some or all of a room, as a creative choice. In such cases, if the plaster's natural color is not desired, tints can be added as part of the mixing process, or can be introduced unevenly for artistic color effects.

== Methodology ==
A plaster veneer wall being troweled smooth.

The plaster veneer method begins with the hanging of specially designated drywall ("blueboard"), in the conventional manner. N.B. In North America, the color of the face paper of drywall indicates its intended application: white for standard, green for moisture resistance, etc. Plaster veneer wallboard is blue or gray. Plaster veneer may also be applied to ordinary drywall, or over existing walls, but this requires "gluing" the existing wall surface by painting on a special adhesive compound, and then applying a thin layer of "base coat" plaster. After the blueboard or base coat covers the interior of a room, the finishing plaster is mixed in batches (typically about 5 gallons), by blending plaster powder with water, to the ideal consistency. Working quickly, a thin layer (usually one to three millimeters) of finish plaster is applied over a wall face before the plaster begins to congeal in the bucket. Over a period of a few hours, as the plaster chemically sets on the wall, it is periodically smoothed or textured using hand trowels, until the desired finish is achieved. When a wall face has sufficiently set, an adjoining face can be safely applied. After the plaster has fully set, it is allowed to cure for a period of days to weeks, permitting excess moisture to escape into the air. If the plaster is no more than about three millimeters thick, two to three days' cure time is usually sufficient. A skilled eye can see areas where moisture is lingering until the curing is complete. After the walls are fully cured, they are ideal for painting or papering.

== Advantages ==
Some considerations favor plaster veneer over mud-and-tape drywall.

- Moisture resistance: Once cured, plaster is an effective water barrier. By contrast, unprotected drywall and joint compound absorb water, causing sagging, bloating, or complete structural failure. As a consequence of plaster's inherent water shedding properties, it is a very effective water and mildew barrier.
- No sanding: Plaster is typically applied in one work session per wall or per several non-adjoining walls. The smoothness or texture is achieved by working the plaster as it sets, over a period of up to five hours. By contrast, drywall is typically sanded or otherwise mechanically smoothed as the final step of the wall surfacing process. The fine dust particles created can be difficult to clean and dangerous to breathe.
- Pleasing surface: Bare plaster can be a beautiful interior surface. The natural color of veneer plaster is a mottled white. When applied for maximum smoothness, it can result in a hard, mirror-like surface, which masks the mechanical uniformity of the drywall with the subtly organic form of a hand-applied layer. Tinting can be added to the wet plaster for color effects.
- Durable surface: Plaster veneer results in a harder and more durable surface than drywall. Scuffs and gouges are less likely.
- Quicker: The overall calendar time from beginning to end for a plaster veneer project is typically slightly shorter than for conventional drywall. (N.B. The overall labor time is usually less with mud-and-tape drywall.) This is because drywall joint compound is applied in at least three phases, followed by sanding. Some drywall joint compounds ("hot mud") set chemically, allowing rapid re-coating, but these compounds can make sanding more difficult. By contrast, each wall in a plaster veneer project is applied as a single task, and allowed to set and cure without intervention.

== Disadvantages ==
Some considerations make plaster veneer a less appropriate choice than mud-and-tape drywall.

- Rare technique: In most locales, there are few trade professionals with the skills for plaster veneer. Where drywall is much more common, it can be difficult even to acquire plastering tools and materials from local suppliers. After a wall is surfaced with plaster, any future work on that wall should ideally be done by a craftsperson familiar with plaster veneer.
- Application time commitment: Once a plaster wall is begun, it must be completed before the worker can stop. This time commitment makes scheduling each task more critical, and can cause a worker to end the work day early or late.
- Cure time: There is only a 24-hour wait time to decorate over "one coat" veneer. Cure time is only for two or three coat plastering that may have lime in the finish. It is recommended to wait 28 days before painting a lime finish wall. However this wait time can be shortened by using an oil based primer once the plaster is dry. Plastering walls with one coat is actually faster than taping since you don't have to wait for three separate coats to dry for 24 hours, as in taping. If heavy patchwork is involved, then yes, there is also a wait time. However, that is typically for drying time not curing.
- More expensive: In comparable settings, the costs of plaster veneer walls is higher than mud-and-tape drywall walls. That is, a skilled tradesman working start to finish at full efficiency can surface mud-and-tape with somewhat less labor than with plaster veneer. Additionally, plaster veneer uses significantly more plaster material than the amount of joint compound in a typical mud-and-tape wall.
