= Stucco =

Construction material made of aggregates, a binder, and water

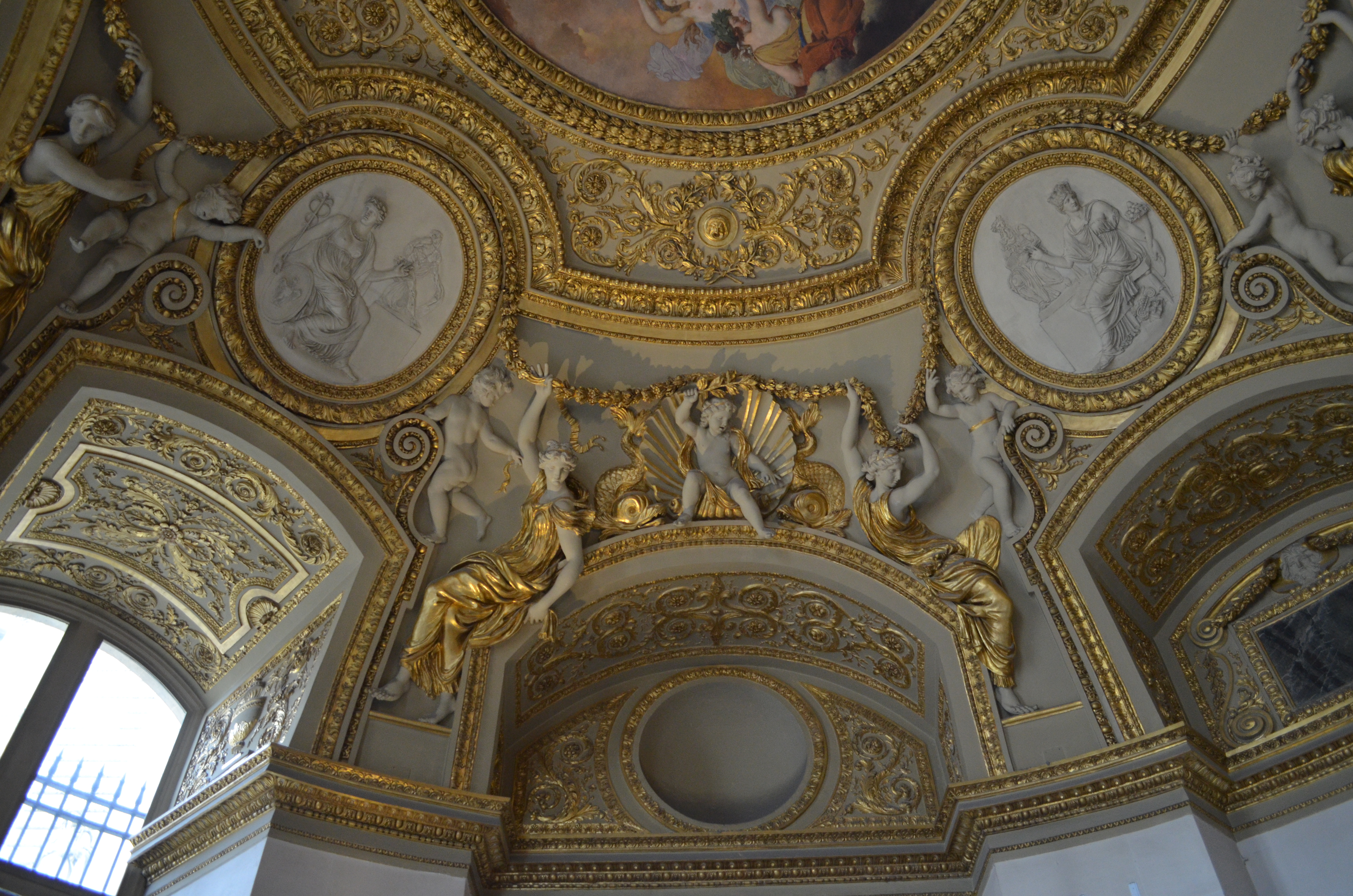
Baroque stucco on the ceiling of the Rotonde de Mars in the Louvre Palace, Paris, by Gaspard and Balthazard Marsy, 1658

Stucco or render is a construction material made of aggregates, a binder, and water. Stucco is applied wet and hardens to a very dense solid. It is most commonly used as a decorative and protective cladding for exterior walls and canopies. Stucco can be applied over construction materials such as metal, expanded metal lath, concrete, cinder block, or clay brick and adobe for decorative, protective or structural purposes.

In English, "stucco" refers to a cladding for the outside of a building and "plaster" to a cladding for interiors. Other European languages, notably Italian, do not have the same distinction: In Italian, stucco means "plaster", and serves for both.

== Composition ==
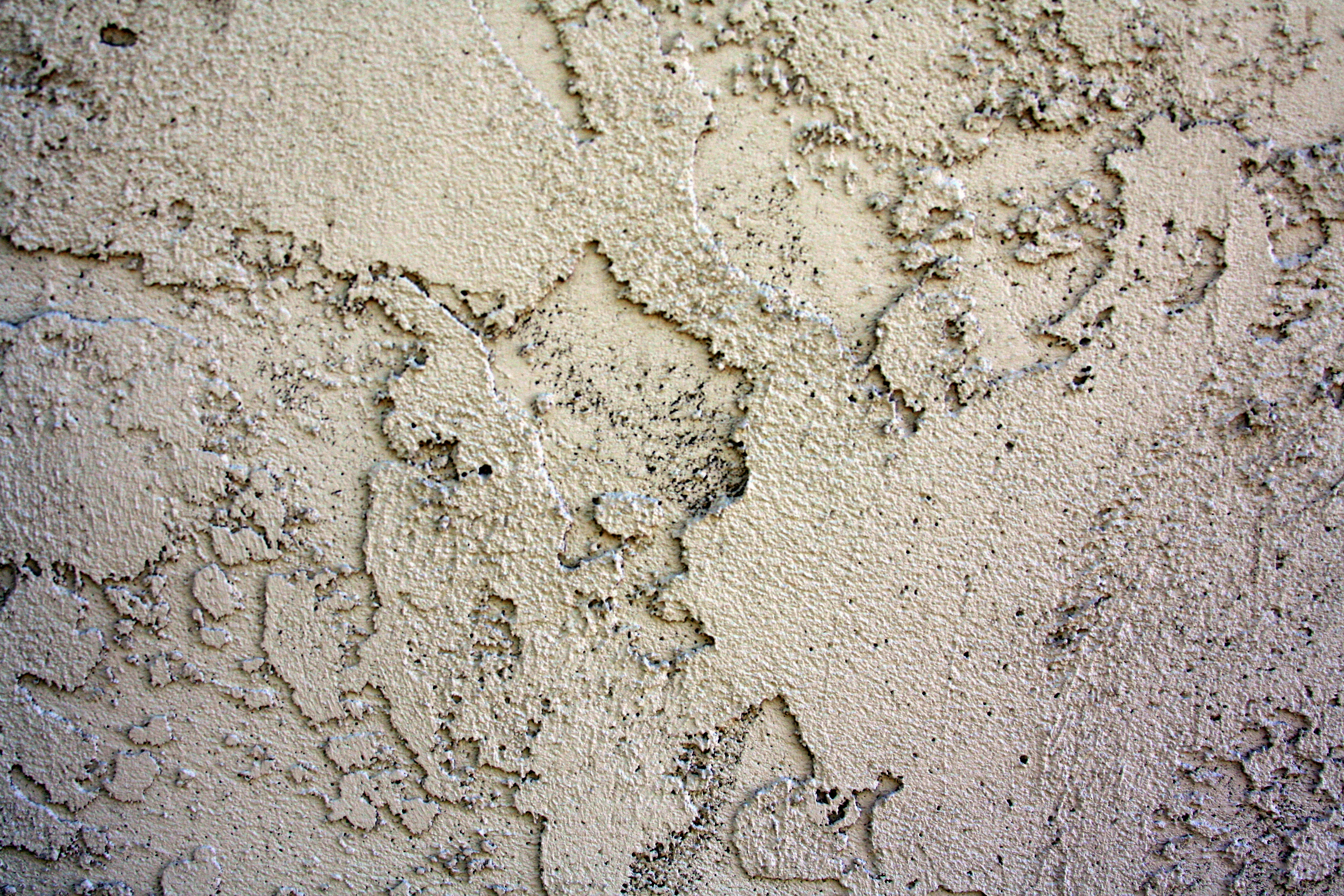
Stucco used as an exterior coating on a residential building.

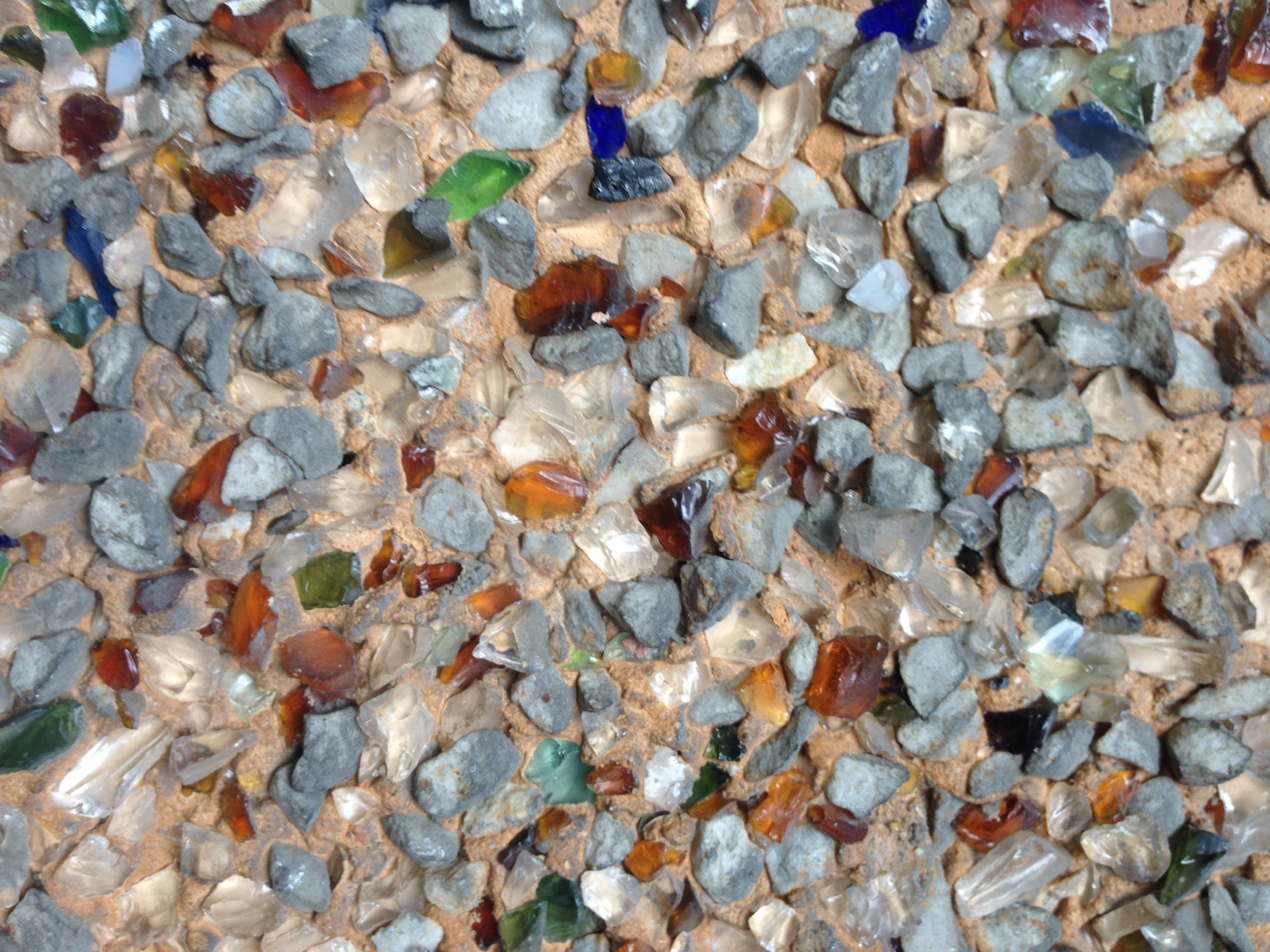
Rock dash stucco used as an exterior coating on a house on Canada's west coast. The chips of quartz, stone, and coloured glass measure approx. 3–6 mm (1/8–1/4").

The basic composition of stucco is lime, water, and sand.

The difference in nomenclature between stucco, plaster, and mortar is based more on use than composition. Until the latter part of the nineteenth century, it was common that mortar as well as plaster, which was used inside a building, and stucco, which was used outside, would consist of the same primary materials: lime and sand.

Animal or plant fibers were often added for additional strength. Sometimes additives such as acrylics and glass fibers are added to improve the structural properties of the stucco. This is usually done with what is considered a one-coat stucco system, as opposed to the traditional three-coat method.

In the later nineteenth century, Portland cement was added with increasing frequency to cover surfaces in contact with soil or water. At the same time, traditional lime plasters were often being replaced by gypsum plaster. Lime is almost as good in balancing humidity as clay. It prevents moisture accumulation inside the building as well as in the wall by its excellent permeability, and is more elastic and workable than cement render.

Lime itself is usually white; color comes from the aggregate or any added pigments. Lime stucco has the property of being self healing to a limited degree because of the slight water solubility of lime (which in solution can be deposited in cracks, where it solidifies). Portland cement stucco is very hard and brittle and can easily crack and separate from the surface if the base on which it is applied is not stable. Typically, its color was gray, from the innate color of most Portland cement, but white Portland cement is also available. Today's stucco manufacturers offer a very wide range of colors that can be mixed integrally in the finish coat. Other materials such as stone and glass chips are sometimes "dashed" onto the finish coat before drying, with the finished product commonly known as "rock dash", "pebble dash", or also as roughcast if the stones are incorporated directly into the stucco, used mainly from the early 20th through the early 21st centuries.

== Traditional stucco ==
As a building material, stucco is a durable, attractive, and weather-resistant wall covering. It was traditionally used as both an interior and exterior finish applied in one or two thin layers directly over a solid masonry, brick, or stone surface. The finish coat usually contained an integral color and was typically textured for appearance.

Then with the introduction and development of heavy timber and light wood-framed construction methods, stucco was adapted for this new use by adding a reinforcement lattice, or lath, attached to and spanning between the structural supports and by increasing the thickness and number of layers of the total system. The lath added support for the wet plaster and tensile strength to the brittle, cured stucco; while the increased thickness and number of layers helped control cracking.

The traditional application of stucco and lath occurs in three coats—the scratch coat, the brown coat and the finish coat. The two base coats of plaster are either hand-applied or machine sprayed. The finish coat can be troweled smooth, hand-textured, floated to a sand finish or sprayed.

Originally, the lath material was strips of wood installed horizontally on the wall, with spaces between, that would support the wet plaster until it cured. This lath and plaster technique became widely used.

In exterior wall applications, the lath is installed over a weather-resistant asphalt-impregnated felt or paper sheet that protects the framing from the moisture that can pass through the porous stucco.

Following World War II, the introduction of metal wire mesh, or netting, replaced the use of wood lath. Galvanizing the wire made it corrosion resistant and suitable for exterior wall applications. At the beginning of the 21st century, this "traditional" method of wire mesh lath and three coats of exterior plaster was still widely used.

In some parts of the United States with a warmer climate (like California, Nevada, Arizona, New Mexico and Florida), stucco is the predominant exterior for both residential and commercial construction. Stucco exterior (with wood frame interior) became a popular alternative in the southwestern United States during the 1970s, as the masonry labor costs for adobe rose.

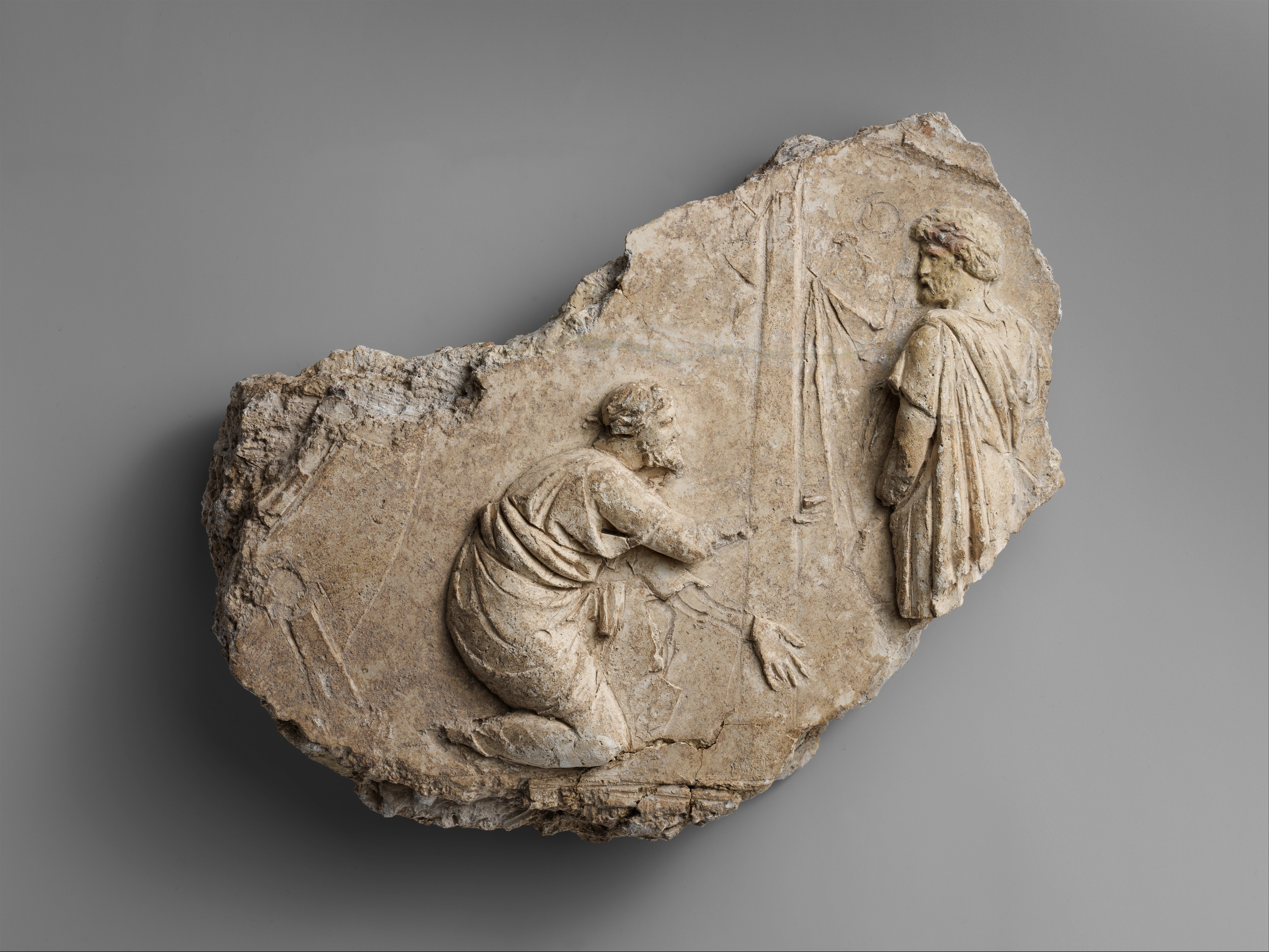
Fragment from a Roman relief; c. 138–161 AD; height: 8¼" (20.9 cm); Metropolitan Museum of Art (New York City)

Statue of seated Buddha; c. 300s; overall: 14½" (36.9 cm); from Hadda (Afghanistan); Cleveland Museum of Art (Cleveland, Ohio, US)

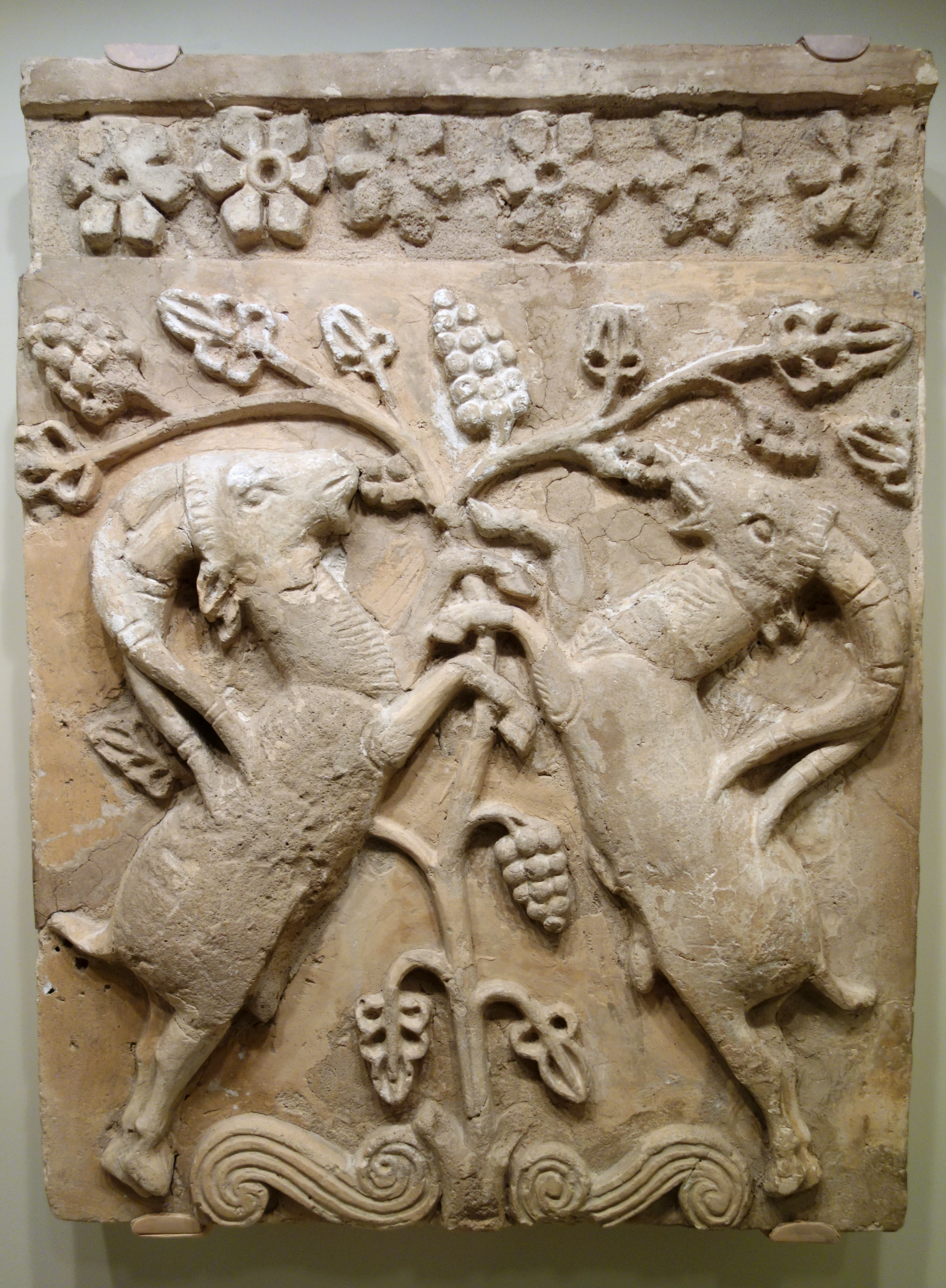
Iranian relief plaque with confronted ibexes; 5th or 6th century AD (the Sasanian period); stucco originally with polychrome painting; Cincinnati Art Museum (Cincinnati, US)

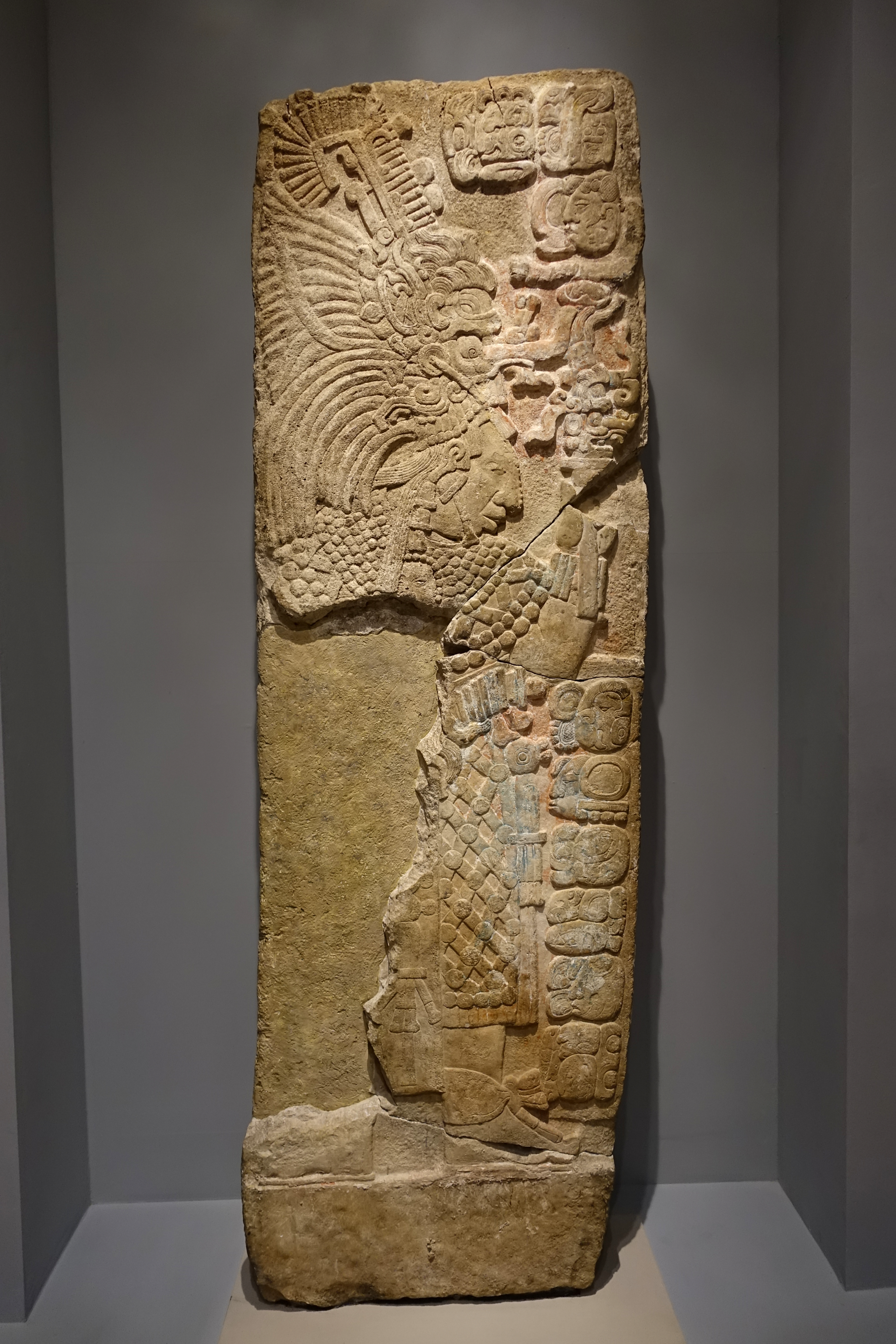
Maya wall panel depicting Ix K'an Bolon; c. 790 AD(Late Classic period); limestone, stucco and paint; from Pomona (Tabasco), Mexico) Dallas Museum of Art (Dallas, Texas, US)

== Sculptural and architectural use ==
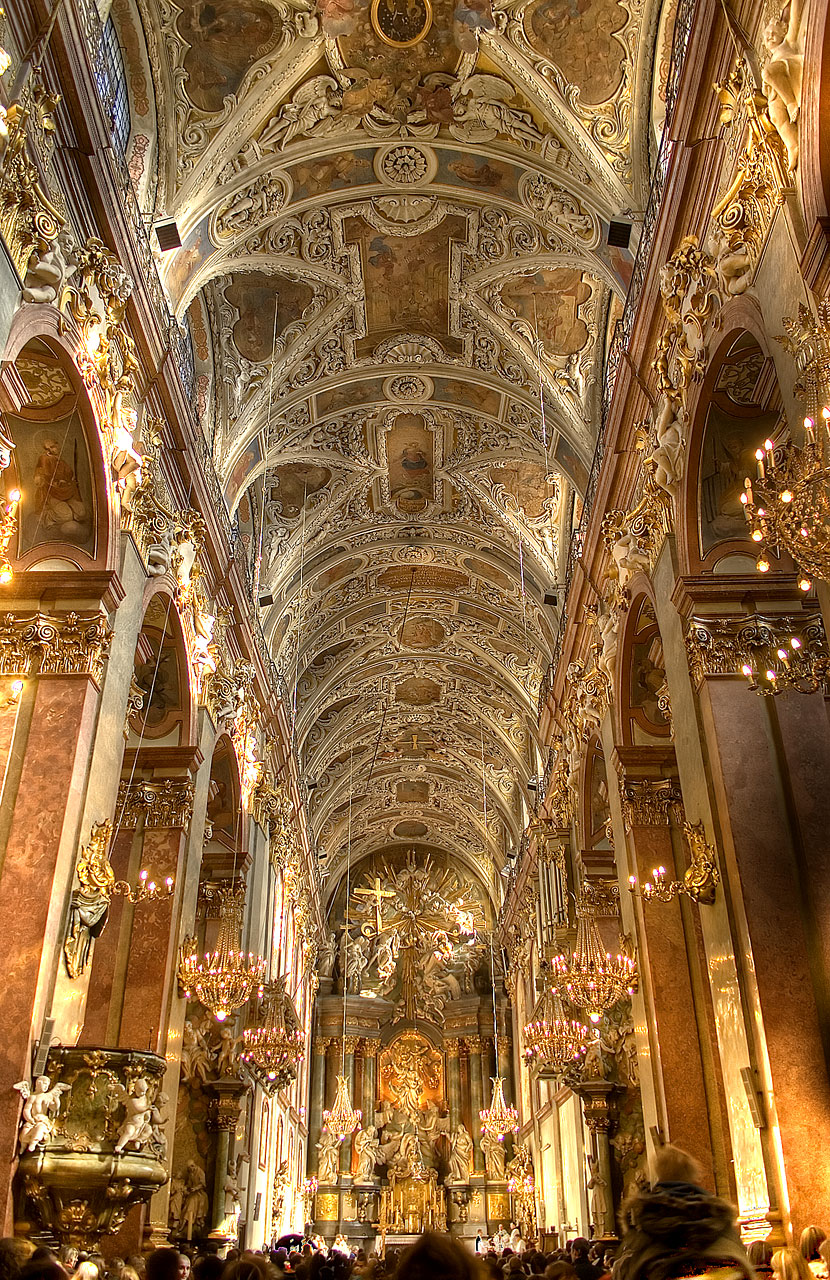
Baroque stucco decorations of the main nave of the Jasna Góra Monastery basilica, 1693–1695

Stucco has also been used as a sculptural and artistic material. Stucco relief was used in the architectural decoration schemes of many ancient cultures. Examples of Egyptian, Minoan, and Etruscan stucco reliefs remain extant. In the art of Mesopotamia and ancient Persian art there was a widespread tradition of figurative and ornamental internal stucco reliefs, which continued into Islamic art, for example in Abbasid Samarra, now using geometrical and plant-based ornament. As the arabesque reached its full maturity, carved stucco remained a very common medium for decoration and calligraphic inscriptions. Indian architecture used stucco as a material for sculpture in an architectural context. It is rare in the countryside.

In Roman art of the late Republic and early Empire, stucco was used extensively for the decoration of vaults. Though marble was the preferred sculptural medium in most regards, stucco was better for use in vaults because it was lighter and better suited to adapt to the curvature of the ceiling. Baroque and Rococo architecture makes heavy use of stucco. Examples can be found in churches and palaces, where stucco is mostly used to provide a smooth, decorative transition from walls to ceiling, decorating and giving measure to ceiling surfaces. Stucco is an integral part of the art of belcomposto, the Baroque concept that integrates the three classic arts, architecture, sculpture, and painting.

The Greco-Buddhist art of modern Afghanistan and northern Pakistan made extensive use in monasteries and temples of stucco for three-dimensional monumental sculpture as well as reliefs. These were usually carved from a rough modelling over a framework and then painted. Similar techniques are used for the life-size statues decorating the gopurams of Hindu temples in modern South Asia.

Since stucco can be used for decoration as well as for figurative representation, it provides an ideal transitive link from architectural details to wall paintings such as the typically Baroque trompe-l'œil ceilings, as in the work of the Wessobrunner School. Here, the real architecture of the church is visually extended into a heavenly architecture with a depiction of Christ, the Virgin Mary or the Last Judgment at the center. Stucco is used to form a semi-plastic extension of the real architecture that merges into the painted architecture.

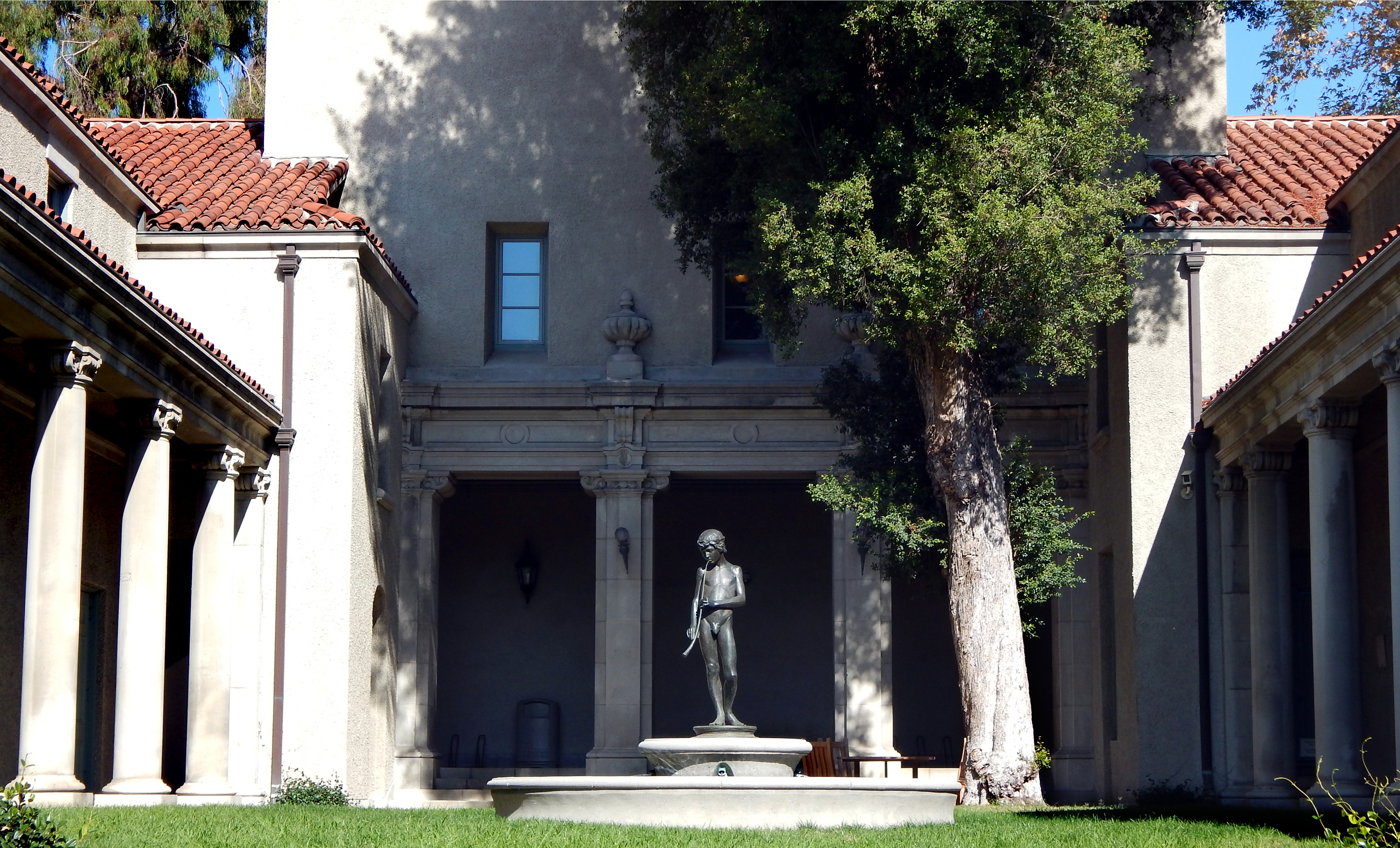
Bridges Hall of Music in Claremont, California (1915), an example of a stucco-clad reinforced concrete structure

Because of its "aristocratic" appearance, Baroque-looking stucco decoration was used frequently in upper-class apartments of the 19th and early 20th century.

Beginning in the 1920s, stucco, especially in its Neo-Renaissance and Neo-Baroque materialization, became increasingly unpopular with modern architects in some countries, resulting not only in new buildings without stucco but also in a widespread Movement to remove the stucco from existing tenements.

Stucco was still employed in the 1950s in molded forms for decorating the joints between walls and ceilings inside houses. It was generally painted the same colour as the ceiling and used in designs where a picture rail or rat rail was in use.

== Modern stucco ==
Modern stucco is used as an exterior cement plaster wall covering. It is usually a mix of sand, Portland cement, lime and water, but may also consist of a proprietary mix of additives including fibers and synthetic acrylics that add strength and flexibility. Modern synthetic stucco can be applied as one base layer and a finish layer, which is thinner and faster to apply, compared to the traditional application of three-coat stucco. Imitation stone stucco can also be produced using the traditional application, but with marble dust being added to the mixture.

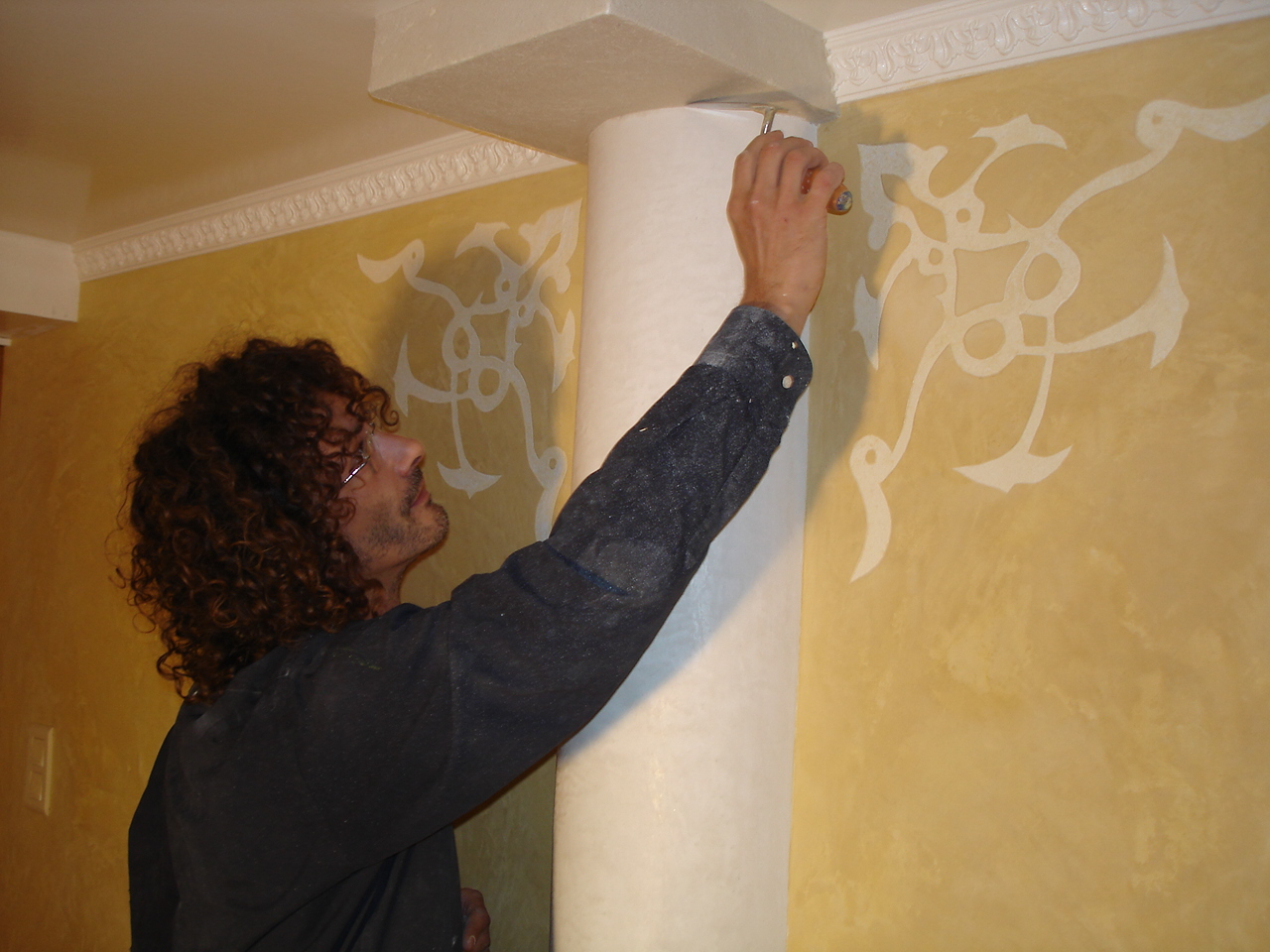
Applying stucco

As with any cement-based material, stucco must be reinforced to resist movement cracking. Plastic or wire mesh lath, attached with nails or screws to the structural framing, is embedded into the base coat to provide stiffening for the stucco.

Where stucco is to be applied to a structure of wood-framing or light-gauge steel framing, the framing is protected from moisture damage by applying a cement based primer, or a vapor-permeable, water-resistant weather barrier; typically an asphalt-saturated paper or one of a variety of manufactured plastic-based sheets, known as "building wraps" or "stucco wraps". The properties of the weather barrier must not only protect the framing from rain and moisture, but at the same time allow the free passage of any water vapor generated inside the building to escape through the wall.

A wide variety of stucco accessories, such as weep screeds, control and expansion joints, corner-aids and architectural reveals are sometimes also incorporated into the lath. Wire lath is used to give the plaster something to attach to and to add strength. Types include expanded-metal lath, woven-wire lath, and welded-wire lath.

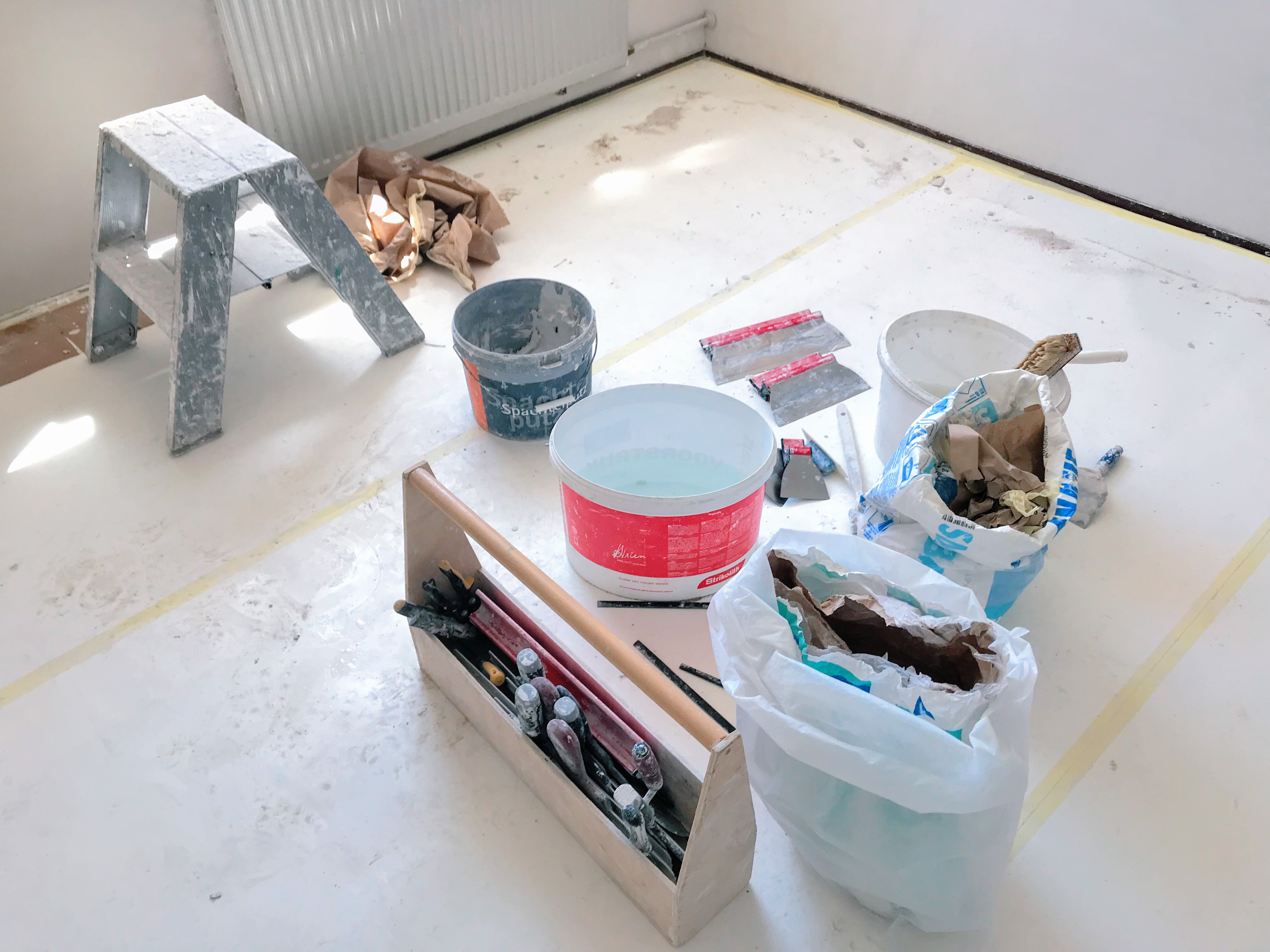
The tools used to plaster walls

If applied during very dry weather, the layers of stucco are sprayed with water for one or more days to keep a level of moisture within the stucco while it cures, a process known as "moist curing". If the stucco dries too soon, the chemical hardening ("hydration") will be incomplete, resulting in a weaker and brittler stucco.

== See also ==
- Plaster, Plasterwork, Pargeting
- Polished plaster, Tadelakt
- Lime plaster, Lime wash, Lime mortar, Harl, Opus albarium
- Cement render
- Clay plaster
- Exterior insulation finishing system
- Lath and plaster
- Siding
- Haveli
- Stucco decoration in Islamic architecture
- Kote-e
