= Mesh =

Interwoven strands of material

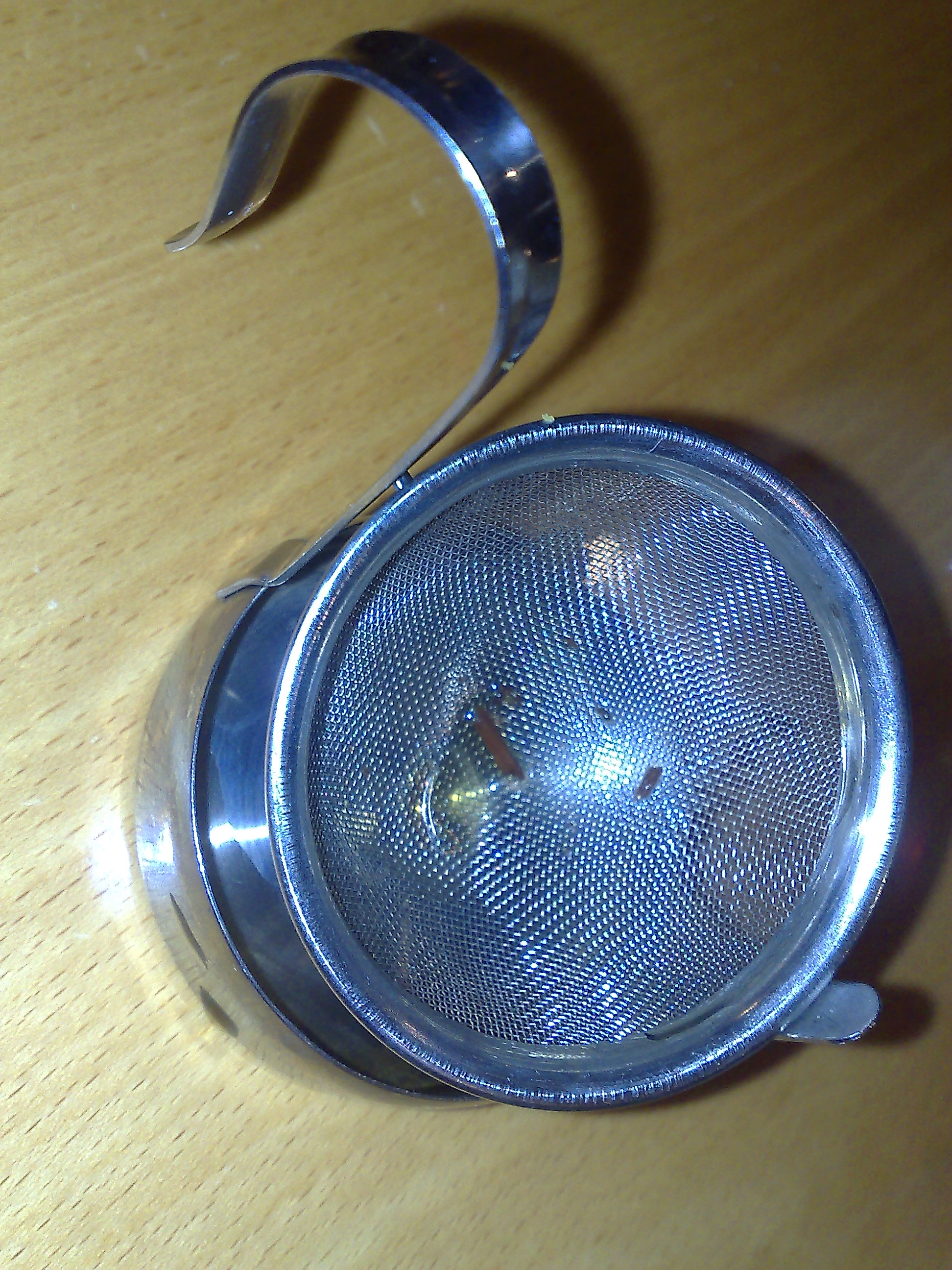
A tea strainer made of metal mesh

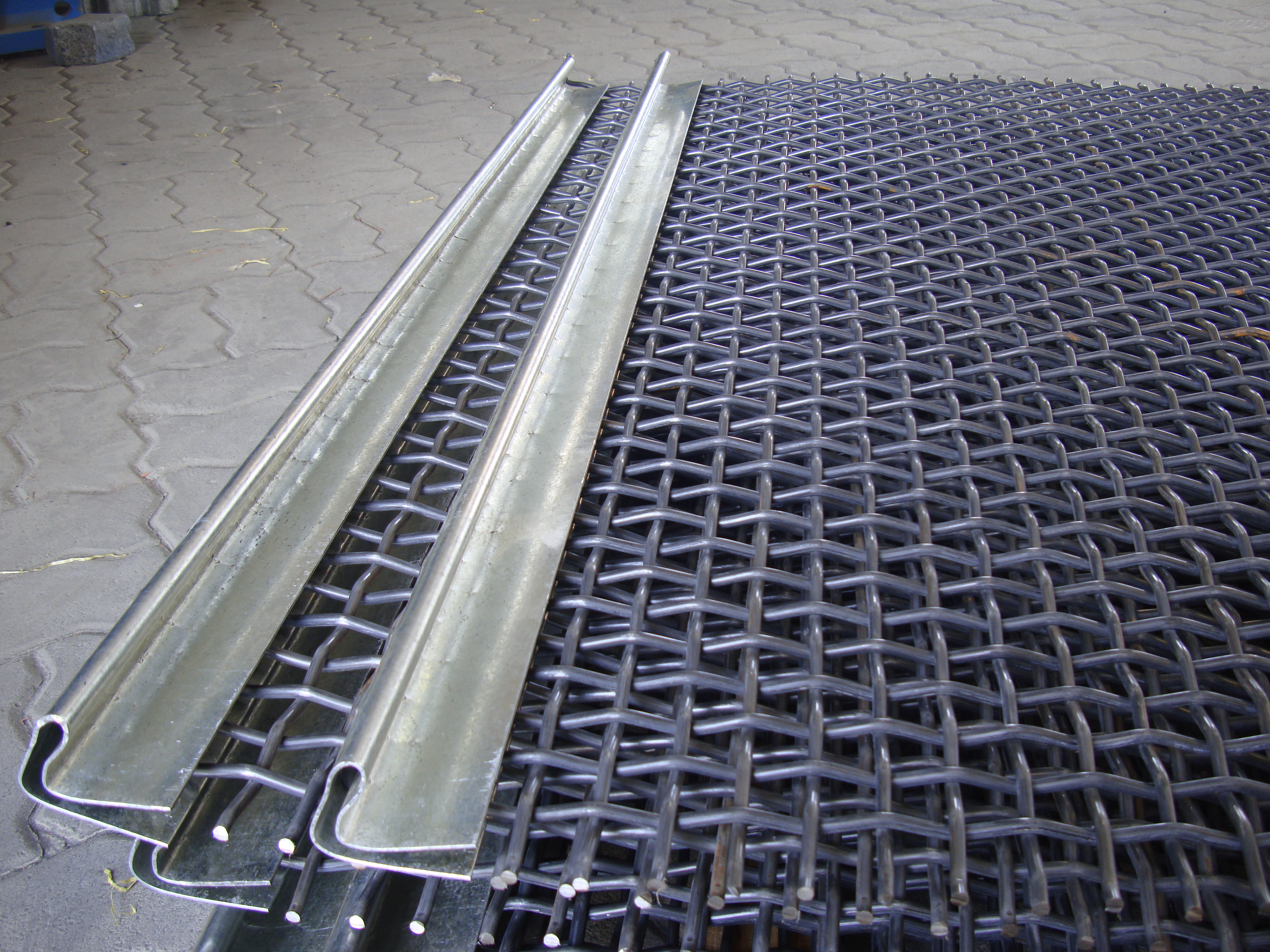
Metal screen mesh

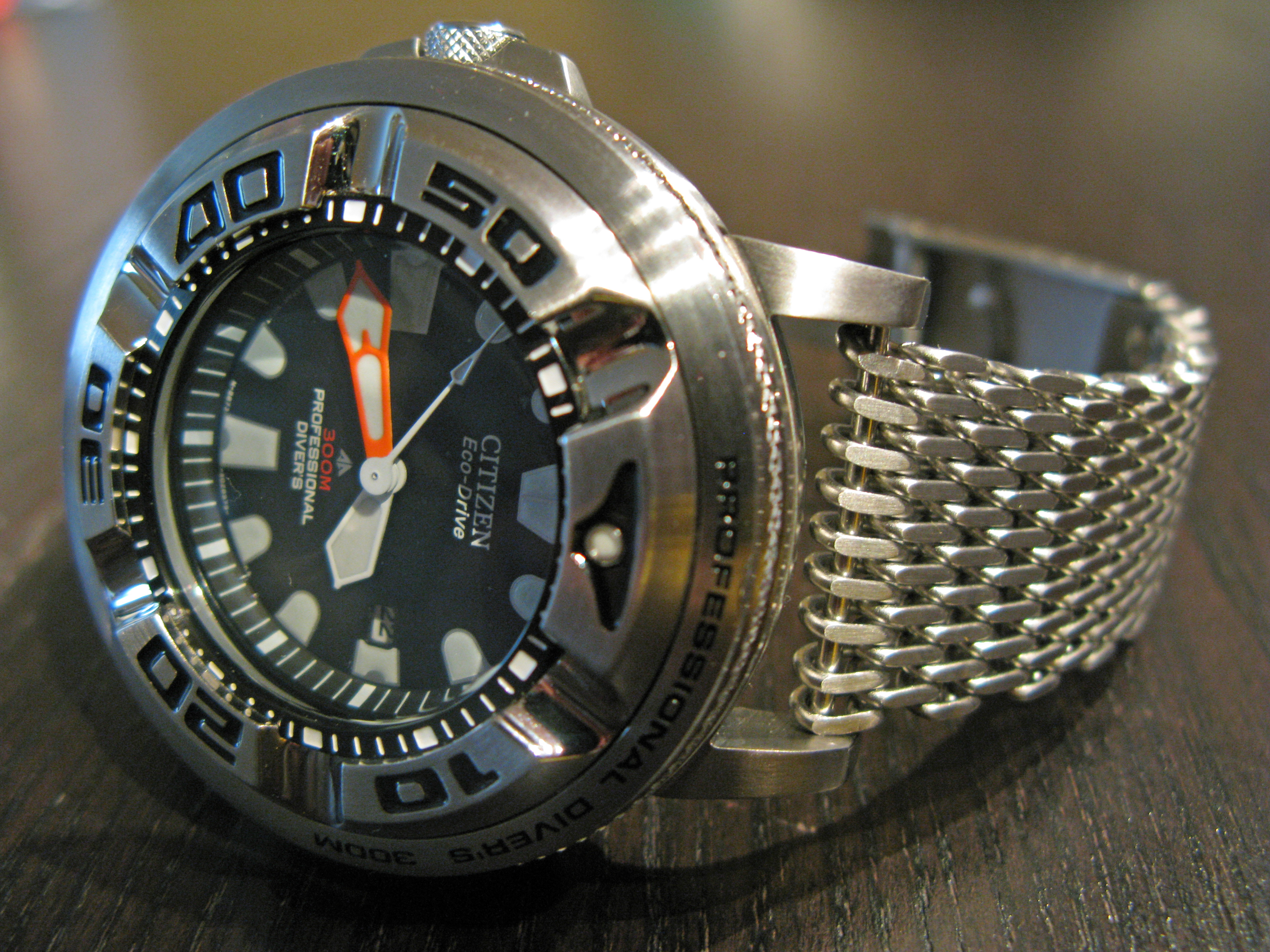
A watch with a stainless steel mesh bracelet

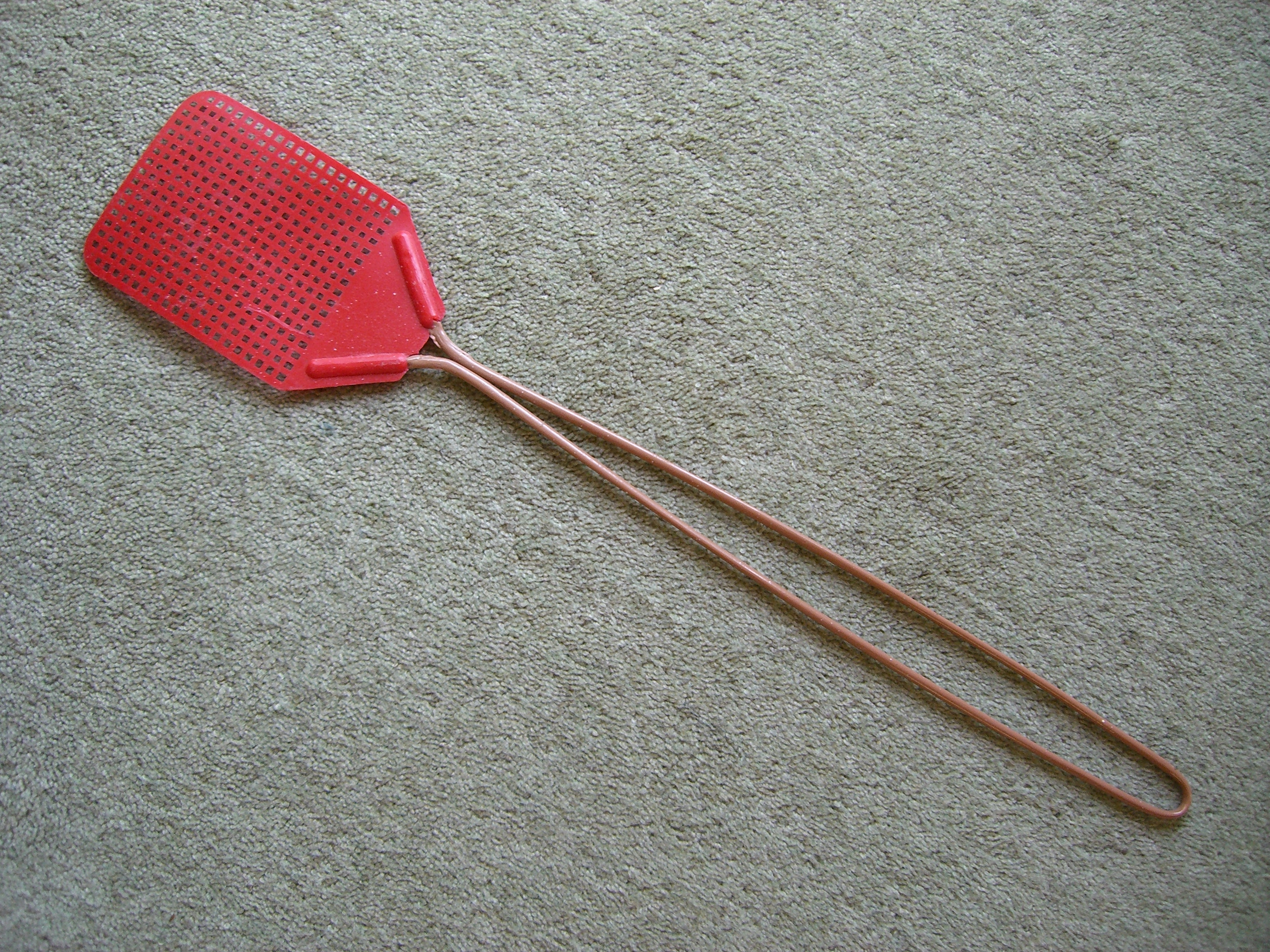
A flyswatter has a plastic mesh that is used to trap insects.

A mesh is a barrier made of interlaced strands of metal, fiber or other flexible or ductile materials. A mesh is similar to a web or a net in that it has many interwoven strands.

== Types ==
- A plastic mesh may be extruded, oriented, expanded, woven or tubular. It can be made from polypropylene, polyethylene, nylon, PVC or PTFE.
- A metal mesh may be woven, knitted, welded, expanded, sintered, photo-chemically etched or electroformed (screen filter) from steel or other metals.
- In clothing, mesh is loosely woven or knitted fabric that has many closely spaced holes. Knitted mesh is frequently used for modern sports jerseys and other clothing like hosiery and lingerie
- A meshed skin graft is a piece of harvested skin that has been systematically fenestrated to create a mesh-like patch. Meshing of skin grafts provides coverage of a greater surface area at the recipient site, and also allows for the egress of excess serous or sanguinous fluid, which can compromise the graft establishment via formation of haematoma or seroma. However, it results in a rather pebbled appearance upon healing that may ultimately look less aesthetically pleasing.
- Fiberglass mesh is a neatly woven, crisscross pattern of fiberglass thread that can be used to create new products such as door screens, filtration components, and reinforced adhesive tapes. It is commonly sprayed with a PVC coating to make it stronger, last longer, and to prevent skin irritation.
- Coiled wire fabric is a type of mesh that is constructed by interlocking metal wire coils via a simple corkscrew method. The resulting spirals are then woven together to create a flexible metal fabric panel. Coiled wire fabric mesh is a product that is used by architects to design commercial and residential structures. It is also used in industrial settings to protect personnel and contain debris. Additionally, coiled wire fabric mesh is used for zoo enclosures, typically aviary and small mammal exhibits.

== Uses ==
- Meshes are often used to screen out insects. Wire screens on windows and mosquito netting are meshes.
- Wire screens can be used to shield against radio frequency radiation, e.g. in microwave ovens and Faraday cages.
- Metal and nylon wire mesh filters are used in filtration.
- Wire mesh is used in guarding for secure areas and as protection in the form of vandal screens.
- Wire mesh can be fabricated to produce park benches, waste baskets and other baskets for material handling.
- Woven meshes are basic to screen printing.
- Surgical mesh is used to provide a reinforcing structure in surgical procedures like inguinal hernioplasty, and umbilical hernia repair.
- Meshes are used as drum heads in practice and electronic drum sets.
- Fence for livestock or poultry (chicken wire or hardware cloth)
- Humane animal trapping uses woven or welded wire mesh cages (chicken wire or hardware cloth) to trap wild animals like raccoons and skunks in populated areas.
- Meshes can be used for eyes in masks.

== See also ==
- Expanded metal
- Faraday cage
- Gauze
  - Wire gauze
- Heating mantle
- Latticework
- Sieve
- Mesh size, a scale for classifying mesh (sieves) used for grading particles by size.
