= Lithium laurate =

Names
- Other names Lithium dodecanoate

Identifiers
CAS Number	14622-13-0
3D model (JSmol)	Interactive image
ChemSpider	2283118
ECHA InfoCard	100.035.133
EC Number	238-663-5
PubChem CID	23663659
CompTox Dashboard (EPA)	DTXSID20163328
- InChI: InChI=1S/C12H24O2.Li/c1-2-3-4-5-6-7-8-9-10-11-12(13)14;/h2-11H2,1H3,(H,13,14);/q;+1/p-1 AZEPWULHRMVZQR-UHFFFAOYSA-M Key: AZEPWULHRMVZQR-UHFFFAOYSA-M
- SMILES: [Li+].CCCCCCCCCCCC(=O)[O-]

Properties
Chemical formula	C_{12}H_{23}LiO_{2}
Molar mass	206.25 g·mol^{−1}
Appearance	Colorless (white) solid
Density	0.87 g/cm^{3}
Melting point	229.8 °C (445.6 °F; 502.9 K)
Solubility in water	Slightly soluble
- Except where otherwise noted, data are given for materials in their standard state (at 25 °C [77 °F], 100 kPa). Infobox references

Lithium laurate is an metallorganic compound with the chemical formula LiO_{2}C(CH_{2})_{10}CH_{3}. It is classified as a metallic soap, i.e. a metal derivative of a fatty acid. In contrast to the lubricants lithium stearate and lithium 12-hydroxystearate, lithium laurate is of minor commercial value.

== Physical properties ==
Lithium laurate forms colorless crystals of the tetragonal crystal system, with cell parameters a = 2.83 nm, c = 1.17 nm, and 24 formula units per cell (Z = 24).

Lithium laurate is slightly soluble in water, ethanol, and diethyl ether.
