= Grease (lubricant) =

Solid or semisolid lubricant

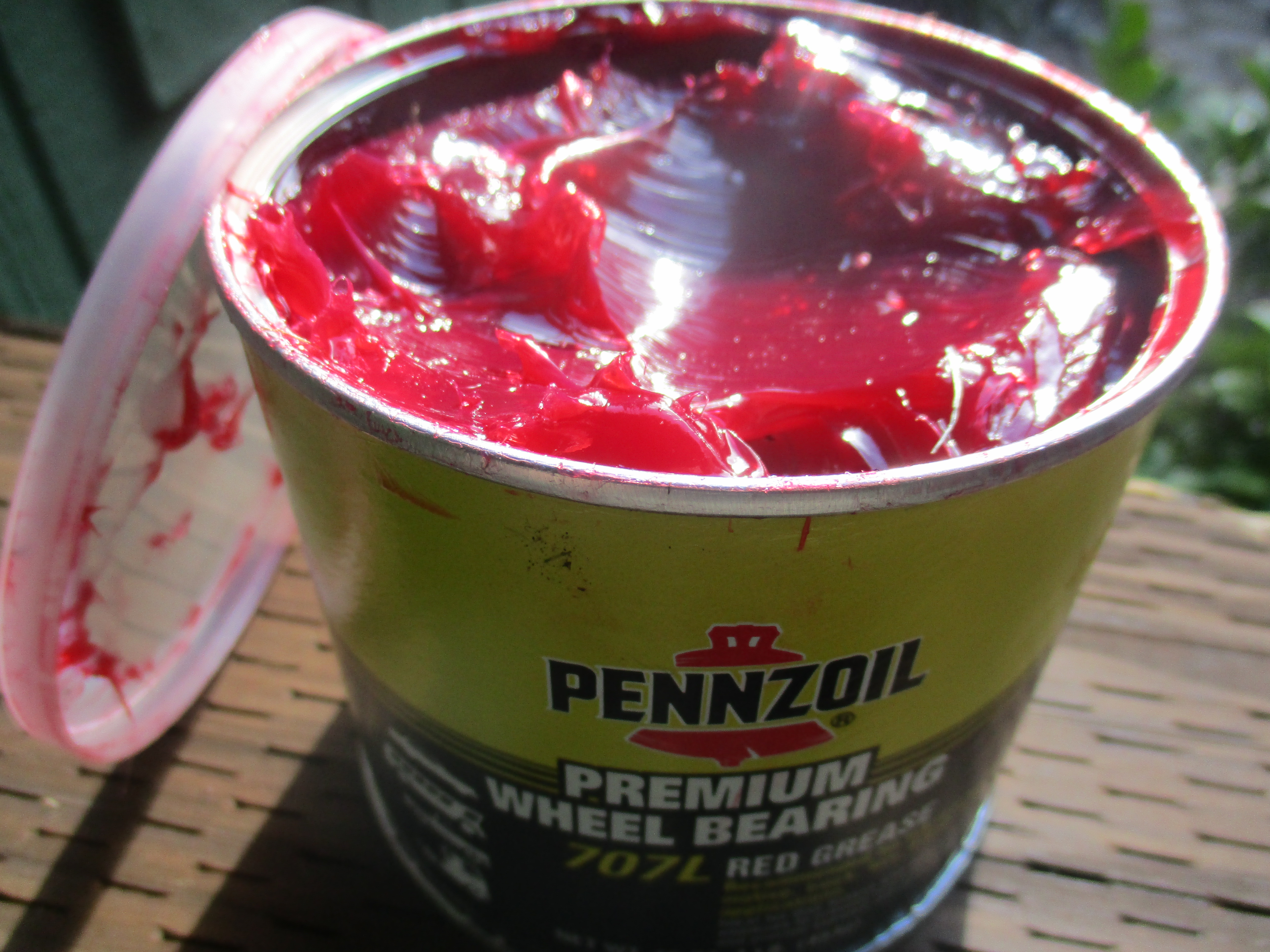
Red wheel-bearing grease for automotive applications

Grease is a solid or semisolid lubricant formed as a dispersion of thickening agents in a liquid lubricant. Grease generally consists of a soap emulsified with mineral, synthetic or vegetable oil.

A common feature of greases is that they possess high initial viscosities which, upon the application of shear, drop to give the effect of an oil-lubricated bearing of approximately the same viscosity as the base oil used in the grease. This change in viscosity is called shear thinning. The term grease is also sometimes used to describe lubricating materials that are simply soft solids or high viscosity liquids, but these materials do not exhibit the shear-thinning properties characteristic of greases meeting the narrower definition. For example, petroleum jellies such as Vaseline are not generally classified as greases.

Greases are applied to mechanisms that can be lubricated only infrequently and where a lubricating oil would not stay in position. They also act as sealants to prevent the ingress of water and incompressible materials. Grease-lubricated bearings have greater frictional characteristics because of their high viscosities.

== Properties ==
A true grease consists of an oil or other fluid lubricant that is mixed with a thickener, typically a soap, to form a solid or semisolid. Greases are usually shear-thinning or pseudo-plastic fluids, which means that the viscosity of the fluid is reduced under shear stress. After sufficient force to shear the grease has been applied, the viscosity drops and approaches that of the base lubricant, such as mineral oil. This sudden drop in shear force means that grease is considered a plastic fluid, and the reduction of shear force with time makes it thixotropic. A few greases are rheotropic, meaning they become more viscous when worked. Grease is often applied using a grease gun, which applies the grease to the part being lubricated under pressure, forcing the solid grease into the spaces in the part.

=== Thickeners ===
An inverse micelle formed when a soap is dispersed in an oil. This structure is broken reversibly upon shearing the grease.

Soaps are the most common emulsifying agent used, and the selection of the type of soap is determined by the application. Soaps include calcium stearate, sodium stearate, lithium stearate, as well as mixtures of these components. Fatty acids derivatives other than stearates are also used, especially lithium 12-hydroxystearate. The nature of the soaps influences the temperature resistance (relating to the viscosity), water resistance, and chemical stability of the resulting grease. Calcium sulphonates and polyureas are increasingly common grease thickeners not based on metallic soaps.

Powdered solids may also be used as thickeners, especially as absorbent clays like bentonite. Fatty oil-based greases have also been prepared with other thickeners, such as tar, graphite, or mica, which also increase the durability of the grease. Silicone greases are generally thickened with silica.

=== Engineering assessment and analysis ===
Lithium-based greases are the most commonly used; sodium- and lithium-based greases have higher melting points (dropping points) than calcium-based greases but are not as resistant to the action of water. Lithium-based grease has a dropping point at 190 to 220 °C (374 to 428 °F). However, the maximum usable temperature for lithium-based grease is 120 °C.

The amount of grease in a sample can be determined in a laboratory by extraction with a solvent followed by e.g. gravimetric determination.

=== Additives ===
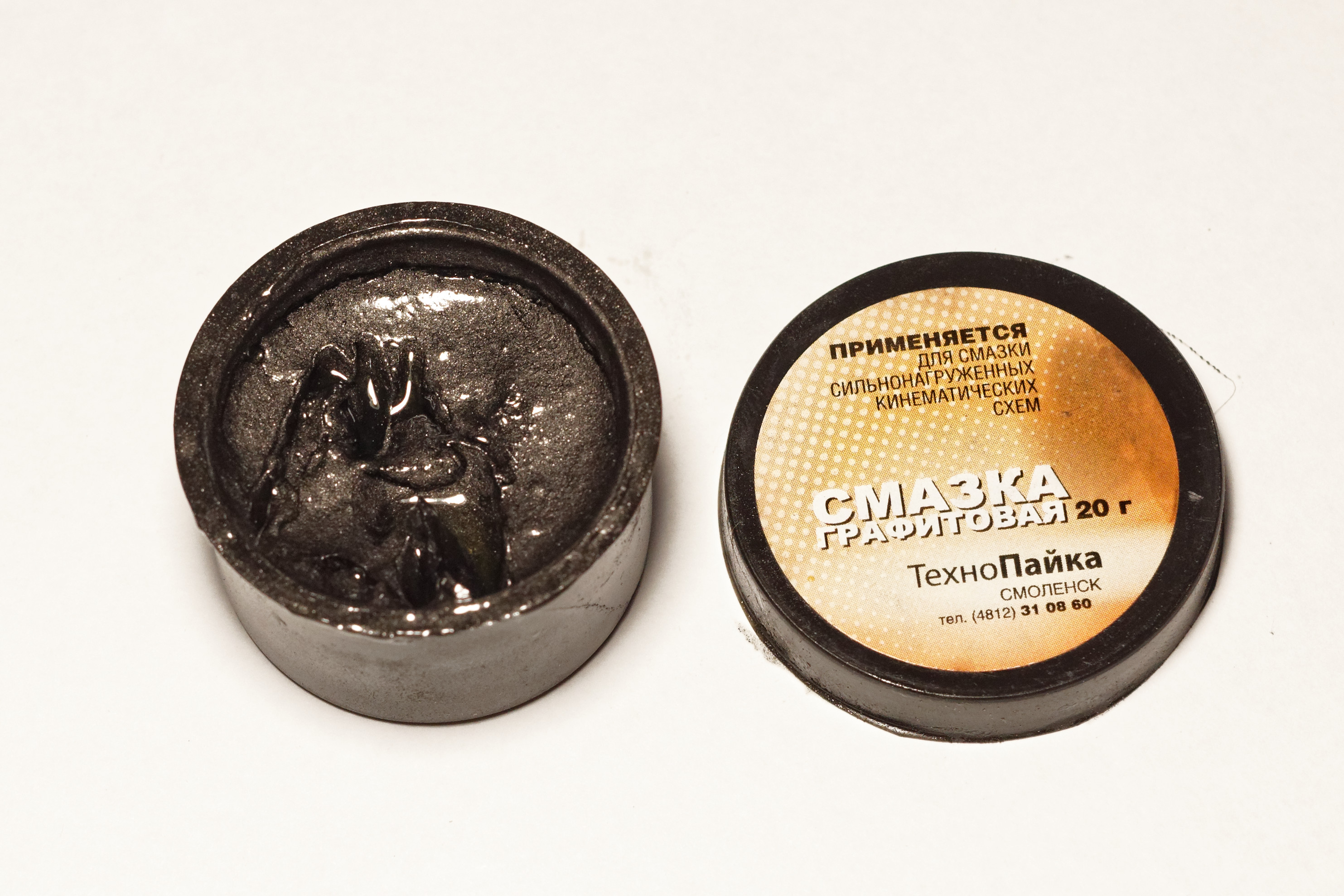
Graphite grease

Some greases are labeled "EP", which indicates "extreme pressure". Under high pressure or shock loading, normal grease can be compressed to the extent that the greased parts come into physical contact, causing friction and wear. EP greases have increased resistance to film breakdown, form sacrificial coatings on the metal surface to protect if the film does break down, or include solid lubricants such as graphite, molybdenum disulfide or hexagonal boron nitride (hBN) to provide protection even without any grease remaining.

Solid additives such as copper or ceramic powder (most often hBN) are added to some greases for static-high-pressure or high-temperature applications, or where corrosion could prevent disassembly of components later in their service lives. These compounds function as release agents. Solid additives cannot be used in bearings because of tight tolerances. Solid additives will cause increased wear in bearings.

== History ==
Grease from the early Egyptian or Roman eras is thought to have been prepared by combining lime with olive oil. The lime saponifies some of the triglyceride that comprises oil to make a calcium grease. In the middle of the 19th century, soaps were intentionally added as thickeners to oils. Over the centuries, all manner of materials have been employed as greases. For example, black slugs Arion ater were used as axle grease to lubricate wooden axle-trees or carts in Sweden.

== Classification and standards ==
Jointly developed by ASTM International, the National Lubricating Grease Institute (NLGI) and SAE International, standard ASTM D4950 “standard classification and specification for automotive service greases” was first published in 1989 by ASTM International. It categorizes greases suitable for the lubrication of chassis components and wheel bearings of vehicles, based on performance requirements, using codes adopted from the NLGI's “chassis and wheel bearing service classification system”:

- LA and LB: chassis lubricants (suitability up to mild and severe duty respectively)
- GA, GB and GC: wheel-bearings (suitability up to mild, moderate and severe duty respectively)

A given performance category may include greases of different consistencies.

The measure of the consistency of grease is commonly expressed by its NLGI consistency number.

The main elements of standard ATSM D4950 and NLGI's consistency classification are reproduced and described in standard SAE J310 “automotive lubricating greases” published by SAE International.

Standard ISO 6743-9 “lubricants, industrial oils and related products (class L) — classification — part 9: family X (greases)”, first released in 1987 by the International Organization for Standardization, establishes a detailed classification of greases used for the lubrication of equipment, components of machines, vehicles, etc. It assigns a single multi-part code to each grease based on its operational properties (including temperature range, effects of water, load, etc.) and its NLGI consistency number.

== Other types ==
=== Silicone grease ===
Silicone grease is based on a silicone oil, usually thickened with amorphous fumed silica.

=== Fluoroether-based grease ===
Fluoropolymers containing C-O-C (ether) with fluorine (F) bonded to the carbon. They are more flexible and often used in demanding environments due to their inertness. Fomblin by Solvay Solexis and Krytox by duPont are prominent examples.

=== Laboratory grease ===
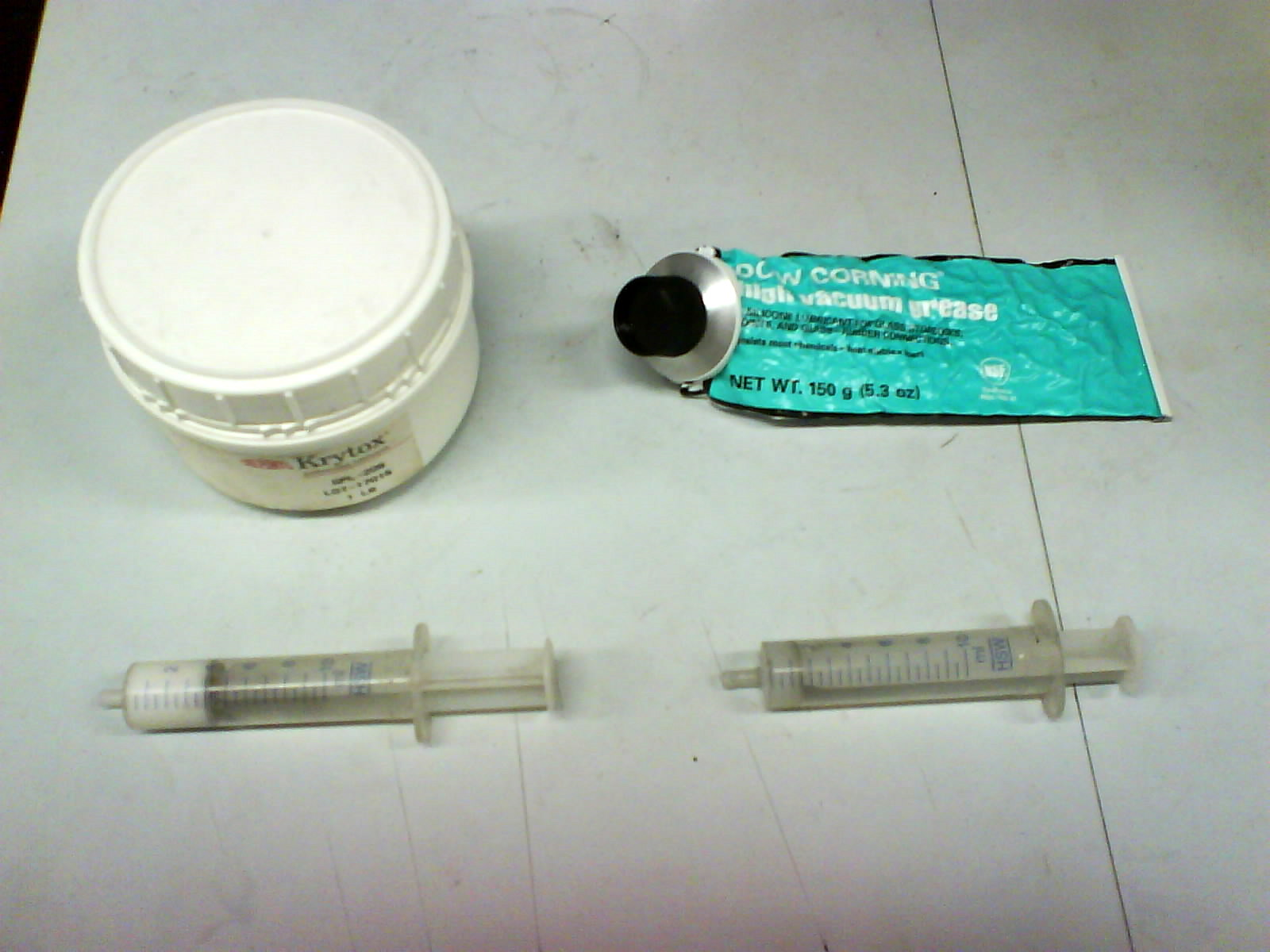
Grease is used to lubricate glass stopcocks and joints. Some laboratories fill them into syringes for easy application. Two typical examples: At left, Krytox, a fluoroether-based grease; at right, a silicone-based high-vacuum grease by Dow Corning.

Apiezon, silicone-based, and fluoroether-based greases are all used commonly in laboratories for lubricating stopcocks and ground glass joints. The grease helps to prevent joints from "freezing", as well as ensuring high-vacuum systems are properly sealed. Apiezon or similar hydrocarbon based greases are the cheapest, and most suitable for high-vacuum applications. However, they dissolve in many organic solvents. This quality makes clean-up with pentane or hexanes trivial, but also easily leads to contamination of reaction mixtures.

Silicone-based greases are cheaper than fluoroether-based greases. They are relatively inert and generally do not affect reactions, though reaction mixtures often get contaminated (detected through NMR near δ 0). Silicone-based greases are not easily removed with solvent, but they are removed efficiently by soaking in a base bath.

Fluoroether-based greases are inert to many substances including solvents, acids, bases, and oxidizers. They are, however, expensive, and are not easily cleaned away.

=== Food-grade grease ===
Food-grade greases are those greases that may come in contact with food and as such are required to be safe to digest. Food-grade lubricant base oils are generally low-sulfur petrochemical, less easily oxidized and emulsified. The United States Department of Agriculture (USDA) has three food-grade designations: H1, H2 and H3. H1 lubricants are food-grade lubricants used in food-processing environments where there is the possibility of incidental food contact. H2 lubricants are industrial lubricants used on equipment and machine parts in locations with no possibility of contact. H3 lubricants are food-grade lubricants, typically edible oils, used to prevent rust on hooks, trolleys and similar equipment.

=== Water-soluble grease analogs ===
In some cases, the lubrication and high viscosity of a grease are desired in situations where non-toxic, non–oil-based materials are required. Carboxymethyl cellulose, or CMC, is one popular material used to create a water-based analog of greases. CMC serves to both thicken the solution and add a lubricating effect, and often silicone-based lubricants are added for additional lubrication. The most familiar example of this type of lubricant, used as a surgical and personal lubricant, is K-Y Jelly.

=== Cork grease ===
Cork grease is a lubricant used to lubricate cork, for example in musical wind instruments. It is usually applied using small applicators like those for lip balm or lipstick.

=== Axle grease ===
Published literature on axle grease is sparse. One of the rare electronically accessible sources describes the preparation of axle grease by first producing a calcium soap by heating a mixture of "rosin oil" with slaked lime. The resulting thick paste is diluted with additional rosin oil. The author disparages the further addition of talc as a thickener.

=== Red rubber grease ===
Special greases are required for lubricating rubber, so that the lubricating oil does not cause the rubber to expand and crack. Vegetable-based oils and special thickeners such as clay are used. The red colour is traditional but not inherent and is simply a dye added to help identification.

== See also ==
- Bearing (mechanical)
- Lubrication
- Lubrication theory
- Penetrant
- Society of Tribologists and Lubrication Engineers
- Timken OK Load
