= Lithium soap =

Soap consisting of a lithium salt of a fatty acid

Examples of Lithium salts of fatty acids

Lithium oleate, the lithium salt of oleic acid.

Lithium palmitate, the lithium salt of palmitic acid.

Lithium stearate, the lithium salt of stearic acid.

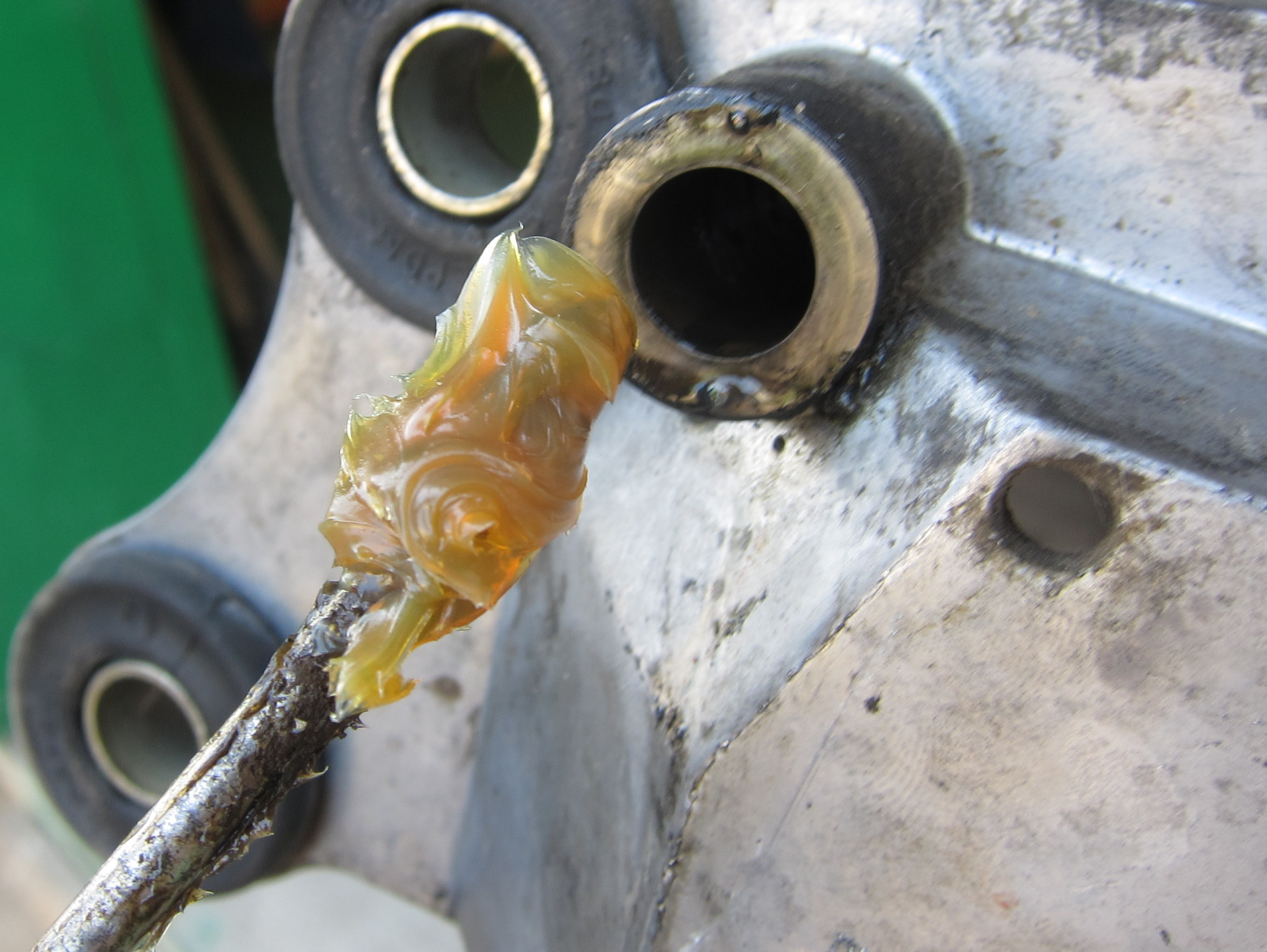
Lithium grease in use

Lithium soap is a soap consisting of a lithium salt of a fatty acid. Sodium-based and potassium-based soaps are used as cleaning agents in domestic and industrial applications, whereas lithium soaps are used as components of lithium grease (white lithium).

Lithium soaps are produced by saponification of triglycerides, using lithium hydroxide or lithium carbonate as the saponification agent. Lithium soaps are used as lubricant components and form-release agents at relatively high temperatures. The main components of lithium soaps are lithium stearate and lithium 12-hydroxystearate.

== Lithium grease ==
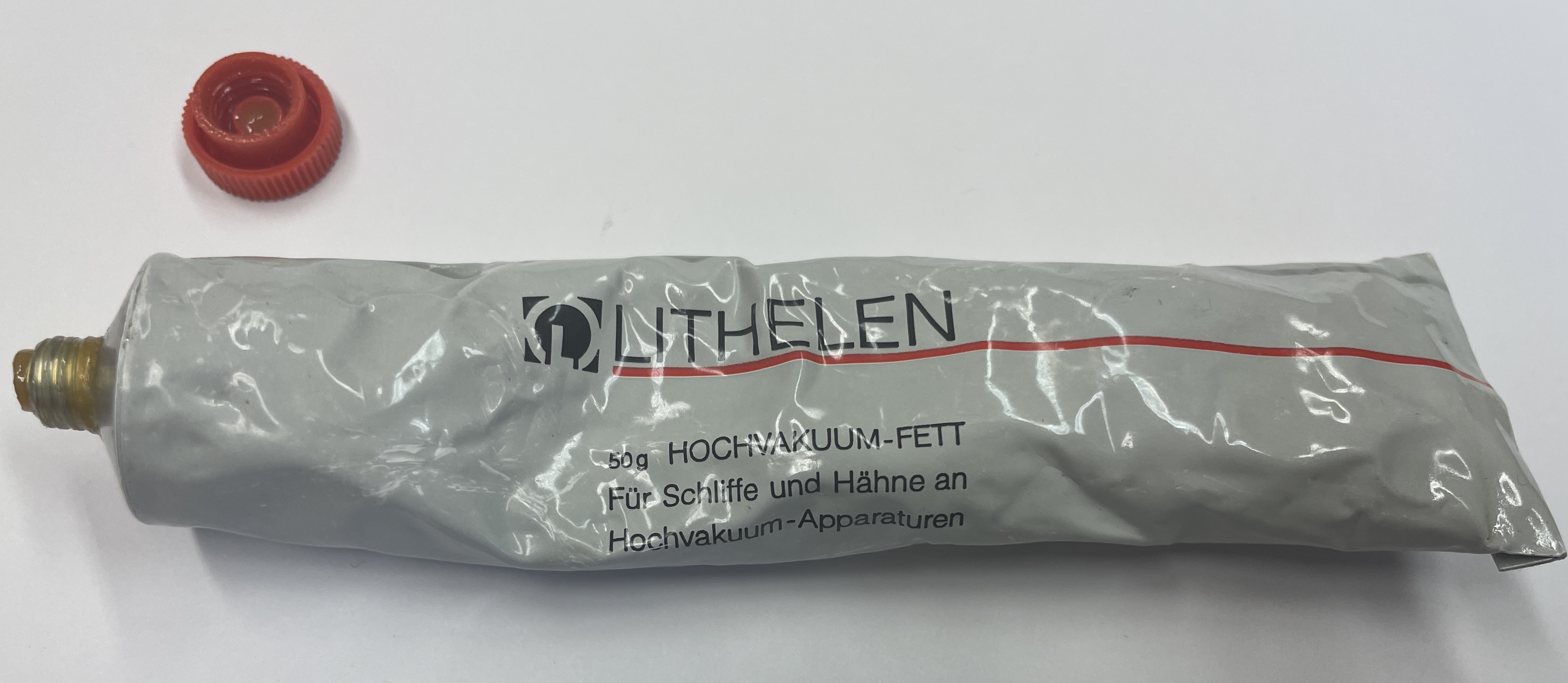
Tube of grease ("Fett" in German) made from lithium soap.

Lubricating greases are commonly formulated as mixtures of an oil and a lithium soap thickener. Some formulations include PTFE or other substances, such as molybdenum disulfide.

Lithium grease adheres particularly well to metal, is non-corrosive, may be used under heavy loads, and exhibits good temperature tolerance. It has a dropping point of 190 to 220 °C (370 to 430 °F) and resists moisture, so it is commonly used as lubricant in household products, such as electric garage doors, as well as in automotive applications, such as constant-velocity joints. Lithium greases using a thickener formed by reacting a simple lithium soap with an acid are known as lithium complex greases and have higher dropping points as well as improvements to other properties.
