= Reed clipper =

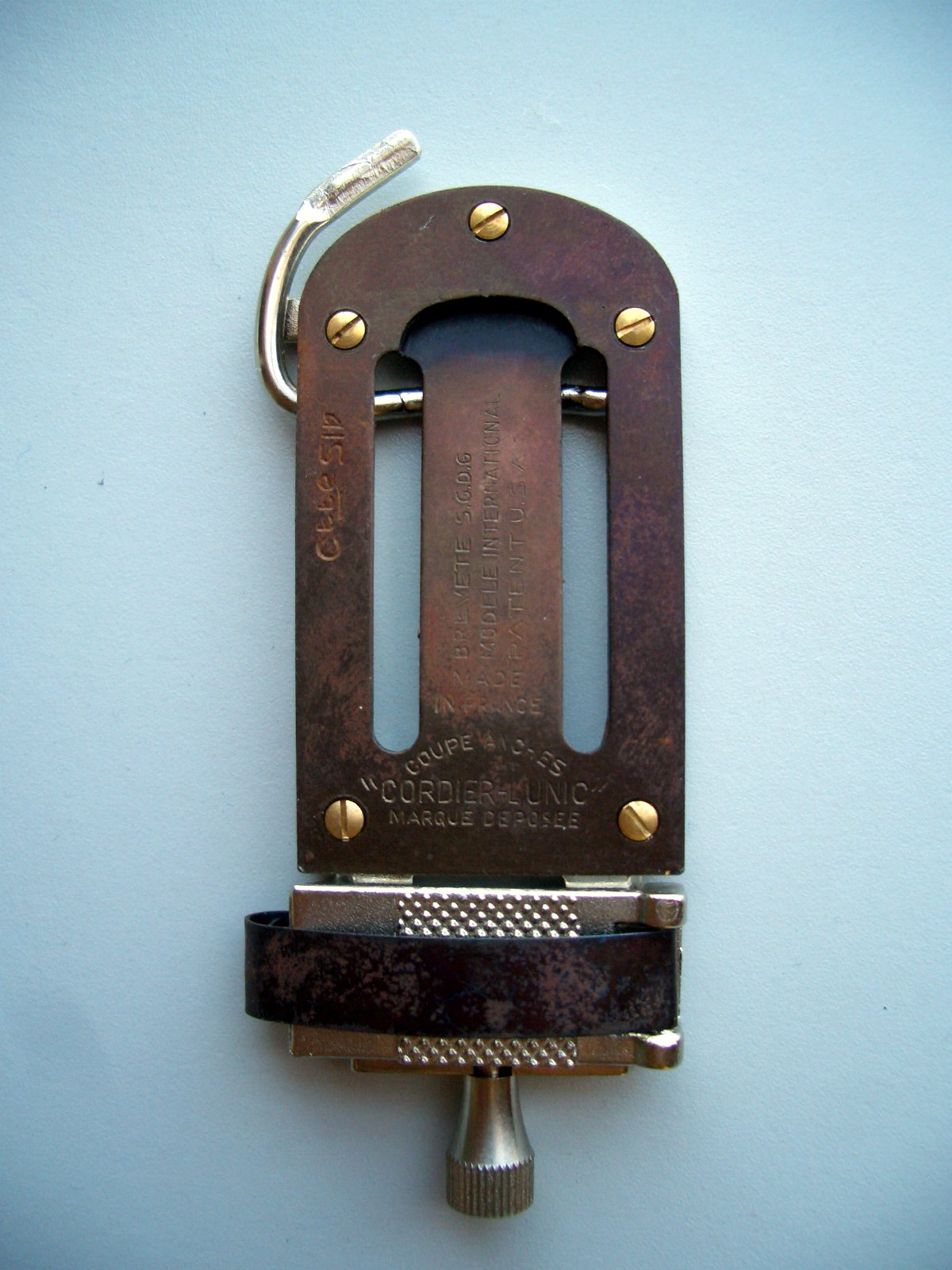
A reed clipper for clarinet.

A reed clipper (also known as a reed trimmer or reed cutter) is a small tool used by clarinet or saxophone players to adjust the single reeds used on those instruments. The clipper is used to trim off a portion from the tip of the reed, similarly to a nail clipper. This can make a soft reed harder or more resistant, remove imperfections on the tip, or extend its life. Clipped reeds are also believed to produce a darker, warmer sound.

A typical design involves fastening the reed onto the tripper by using a flexible strip of steel, and adjusting the height of the reed by using a knurled knob. Once the reed is positioned at the desired height, a small lever is pulled, which clips off a sliver of material from the tip. There is often a strap to secure the clipper in place.

Another design, pioneered by the Vandoren company in the 1980s, involves the reed lying on a stationary table, positioned above a sharp blade. In this design, the cutting is accomplished by lowering a hinged lid which slides the reed tip against the blade.
