= National Lubricating Grease Institute =

The National Lubricating Grease Institute is an international trade association that serves the grease and gear lubricant industry. It exists to promote research and development of lubrication technology. It also publishes industry standards for greases.

== History ==
The NLGI was incorporated by a small number of U.S. companies in 1933 to create a code for the National Recovery Act. The original name of the organization was the National Association of Lubricating Grease Manufacturers, Inc. The name was changed in 1937 as the industry recognized the need for a joint development and standards association and membership grew.

The NLGI is a not-for-profit corporation whose membership includes grease manufacturers and sales organizations, associated equipment manufacturers, industry suppliers, service organizations, research and educational groups. Membership is open to corporations and individuals.

According to information posted by the NLGI in 2004, the institute has member organizations in 26 countries, while subscriptions to its journal, the NLGI Spokesman, represent 50 countries.

== Standards ==
In cooperation with ASTM International and SAE International, the NLGI has developed the categorisation of lubricating greases specified in standard ASTM D4950 “standard classification and specification for automotive service greases”, reproduced in standard SAE J310 “automotive lubricating greases”. The NLGI retains jurisdiction over the designation and definition of the categories, which it publishes in its “chassis and wheel bearing service classification system”. The NLGI has also created a symbol, the NLGI Certification Mark, which can be used on containers of greases to advertise their ASTM D4950 category.

The measure of the consistency of a lubricating grease is commonly expressed by its NLGI consistency number, defined by the NLGI in the “standard classification of lubricating grease”. The NLGI consistency number is used in several standards: ASTM D4950, SAE J310 and ISO 6743-9 “lubricants, industrial oils and related products (class L) — classification — part 9: family X (greases)”.

The NLGI also administers a professional certification program. Individuals passing an examination designed to test their knowledge in the field of lubricating grease obtain the Certified Lubricating Grease Specialist (CLGS) certification.
