= Saponification =

Process that converts fat, oil, or lipid into soap and alcohol

Saponification (from Latin sapo 'soap') is a process of cleaving esters into carboxylate salts and alcohols by the action of aqueous alkali. Typically aqueous sodium hydroxide solutions are used. It is an important type of alkaline hydrolysis. When the carboxylate is a long chain, its salt is called a soap. The saponification of ethyl acetate gives sodium acetate and ethanol:

C_{2}H_{5}O_{2}CCH_{3} + NaOH → C_{2}H_{5}OH + NaO_{2}CCH_{3}

== Saponification of fats ==
Vegetable oils and animal fats are the traditional materials that are saponified. These greasy materials, triesters called triglycerides, are usually mixtures derived from diverse fatty acids. In the traditional saponification, the triglyceride is treated with lye, which cleaves the ester bonds, releasing fatty acid salts (soaps) and glycerol. In one simplified version, the saponification of stearin gives sodium stearate.

C_{3}H_{5}(O_{2}C(CH_{2})_{16}CH_{3})_{3} + 3 NaOH → C_{3}H_{5}(OH)_{3} + 3 NaO_{2}C(CH_{2})_{16}CH_{3}

This process is the main industrial method for producing glycerol (C_{3}H_{5}(OH)_{3}).

Some soap-makers leave the glycerol in the soap. Others precipitate the soap by salting it out with sodium chloride.

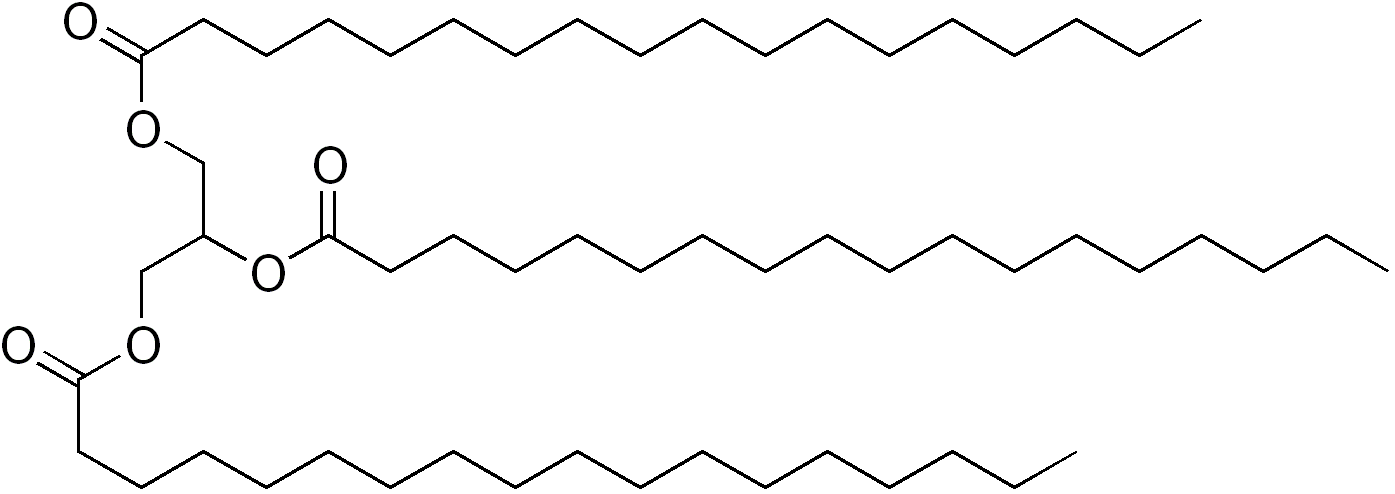
Skeletal formula of stearin, a triglyceride that is converted by saponification with sodium hydroxide into glycerol and sodium stearate.

Fat in a corpse converts into adipocere, often called "grave wax". This process is more common where the amount of fatty tissue is high and the agents of decomposition are absent or only minutely present.

=== Saponification value ===
The saponification value is the amount of base required to saponify a fat sample. Soap makers formulate their recipes with a small deficit of lye to account for the unknown deviation of saponification value between their oil batch and laboratory averages.

=== Mechanism of basic hydrolysis ===
The hydroxide anion adds to the carbonyl group of the ester. The immediate product is called an orthoester.

Saponification part I

Expulsion of the alkoxide generates a carboxylic acid:

Saponification part II

The alkoxide ion is a strong base so the proton is transferred from the carboxylic acid to the alkoxide ion, creating an alcohol:

saponification part III

In a classic laboratory procedure, the triglyceride trimyristin is obtained by extracting it from nutmeg with diethyl ether. Saponification to the soap sodium myristate takes place using NaOH in water. Treating the soap with hydrochloric acid gives myristic acid.

== Saponification of fatty acids ==
The reaction of fatty acids with a base is another main method of saponification. In this case, the reaction involves neutralization of the carboxylic acid. The neutralization method is used to produce industrial soaps, such as those derived from magnesium, transition metals, and aluminium. This method is ideal for producing soaps derived from a single fatty acid, resulting in soaps with predictable physical properties, as required by many engineering applications.

== Applications ==
=== Hard and soft soaps ===
Depending on the nature of the alkali used in their production, soaps have distinct properties. Sodium hydroxide (NaOH) produces "hard" soaps; hard soaps can also be used in water containing Mg, Cl, and Ca salts. By contrast, potassium soaps (derived using KOH) are "soft" soaps. The fatty acid source also affects the soap's melting point. Most early hard soaps were manufactured using animal fats and potash (KOH) extracted from wood ash; these were broadly solid. However, the majority of modern soaps are manufactured from polyunsaturated triglycerides such as vegetable oils. As with the triglycerides they are formed from, the salts of these acids have weaker inter-molecular forces and thus lower melting points.

=== Lithium soaps ===
Lithium 12-hydroxystearate and other lithium-based fatty acids are important constituents of lubricating greases. In lithium-based greases, lithium carboxylates are thickeners. "Complex soaps" are also common, these being combinations of more than one acid salt, such as azelaic or acetic acid.

=== Fire extinguishers ===
Fires involving cooking fats and oils (classified as class K (US) or F (Australia/Europe/Asia)) burn hotter than most flammable liquids, rendering a standard class B extinguisher ineffective. Such fires should be extinguished with a wet chemical extinguisher. Extinguishers of this type are designed to extinguish cooking fats and oils through saponification. The extinguishing agent rapidly converts the burning substance to a non-combustible soap.

== Oil paints ==
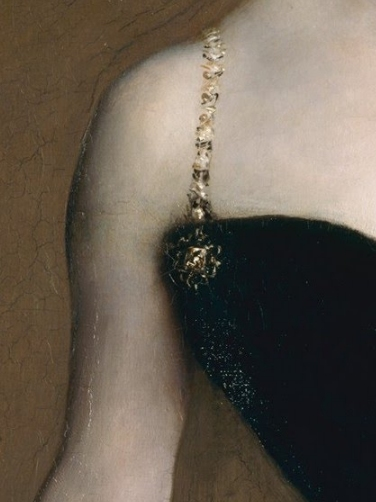
Detail of Madame X (Madame Pierre Gautreau), John Singer Sargent, 1884, showing saponification in the black dress.

Saponification can occur in oil paintings over time, causing visible damage and deformation. Oil paints are composed of pigment molecules suspended in an oil-binding medium. Heavy metal salts are often used as pigment molecules, such as in lead white, red lead, and zinc white. If those heavy metal salts react with free fatty acids in the oil medium, metal soaps may form in a paint layer that can then migrate outward to the painting's surface.

Saponification in oil paintings was described as early as 1912. It is believed to be widespread, having been observed in many works dating from the fifteenth through the twentieth centuries; works of different geographic origin; and works painted on various supports, such as canvas, paper, wood, and copper. Chemical analysis may reveal saponification occurring in a painting's deeper layers before any signs are visible on the surface, even in paintings centuries old.

The saponified regions may deform the painting's surface through the formation of visible lumps or protrusions that can scatter light. These soap lumps may be prominent only on certain regions of the painting rather than throughout. In John Singer Sargent's famous Portrait of Madame X, for example, the lumps only appear on the blackest areas, which may be because of the artist's use of more medium in those areas to compensate for the tendency of black pigments to soak it up. The process can also form chalky white deposits on a painting's surface, a deformation often described as "blooming" or "efflorescence", and may also contribute to the increased transparency of certain paint layers within an oil painting over time.

Saponification does not occur in all oil paintings and many details are unresolved. At present, retouching is the only known restoration method.

== See also ==
- Soap
- Saponification value
- Ester hydrolysis
