= NLGI consistency number =

Standard for grease in lubrication

The NLGI consistency number or NLGI grade expresses a measure of the relative hardness of a grease used for lubrication, as specified by the standard classification of lubricating grease established by the National Lubricating Grease Institute (NLGI). Reproduced in standards ASTM D4950 (“standard classification and specification of automotive service greases”) and SAE J310 (“automotive lubricating greases”), NLGI's classification is widely used. The NLGI consistency number is also a component of the code specified in standard ISO 6743-9 “lubricants, industrial oils and related products (class L) — classification — part 9: family X (greases)”.

The NLGI consistency number alone is not sufficient for specifying the grease required by a particular application. However, it complements other classifications (such as ASTM D4950 and ISO 6743-9). Besides consistency, other properties (such as structural and mechanical stability, apparent viscosity, resistance to oxidation, etc.) can be tested to determine the suitability of a grease to a specific application.

== Test method ==
NLGI's classification defines nine grades, each associated to a range of ASTM worked penetration values, measured using the test defined by standard ASTM D217 “cone penetration of lubricating grease”. This involves two test apparatus. The first apparatus consists of a closed container and a piston-like plunger. The face of the plunger is perforated to allow grease to flow from one side of the plunger to another as the plunger is worked up and down. The test grease is inserted into the container and the plunger is stroked 60 times while the test apparatus and grease are maintained at a temperature of 25 °C.

Once worked, the grease is placed in a penetration test apparatus. This apparatus consists of a container, a specially-configured cone and a dial indicator. The container is filled with the grease and the top surface of the grease is smoothed over. The cone is placed so that its tip just touches the grease surface and the dial indicator is set to zero at this position. When the test starts, the weight of the cone will cause it to penetrate into the grease. After a specific time interval the depth of penetration is measured.

== Classification ==
The following table shows the NLGI classification and compares each grade with household products of similar consistency.

NLGI consistency numbers
NLGI number	ASTM worked (60 strokes) penetration at 25 °C tenths of a millimetre	Appearance	Consistency food analogy
000	445-475	fluid	cooking oil
00	400-430	semi-fluid	apple sauce
0	355-385	very soft	brown mustard
1	310-340	soft	tomato paste
2	265-295	"normal" grease	peanut butter
3	220-250	firm	vegetable shortening
4	175-205	very firm	frozen yogurt
5	130-160	hard	smooth pâté
6	85-115	very hard	cheddar cheese

Common greases are in the range 1 through 3. Those with a NLGI No. of 000 to 1 are used in low viscosity applications. Examples include enclosed gear drives operating at low speeds and open gearing. Grades 0, 1 and 2 are used in highly loaded gearing. Grades 1 through 4 are often used in rolling contact bearings. Greases with a higher number are firmer, tend to stay in place and are a good choice when leakage is a concern.
