= Soap =

Substance used for cleaning

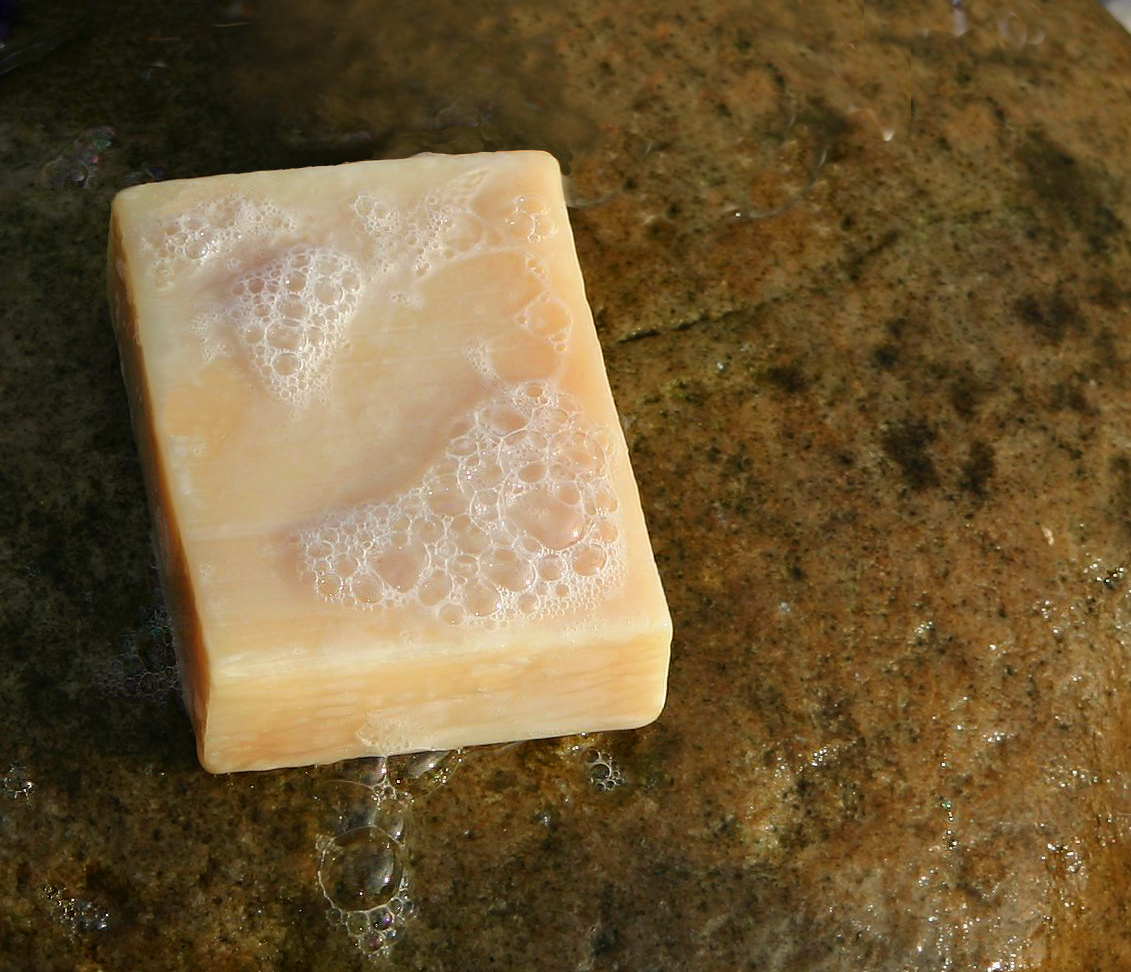
A handmade soap bar

Two equivalent images of the chemical structure of sodium stearate, a typical ingredient found in bar soaps

Emulsifying action of soap on oil

Soap is a salt of a fatty acid (sometimes other carboxylic acids) used for cleaning and lubricating products as well as other applications. In a domestic setting, soaps, specifically "toilet soaps", are surfactants typically used for washing, bathing, and other types of housekeeping. In industrial settings, soaps are used as thickeners, components of some lubricants, emulsifiers, and catalysts.

Soaps are often produced by mixing fats and oils with a base. Humans have used soap for millennia, and evidence exists for the production of soap-like materials in ancient Babylon around 2800 BC.

== Types ==
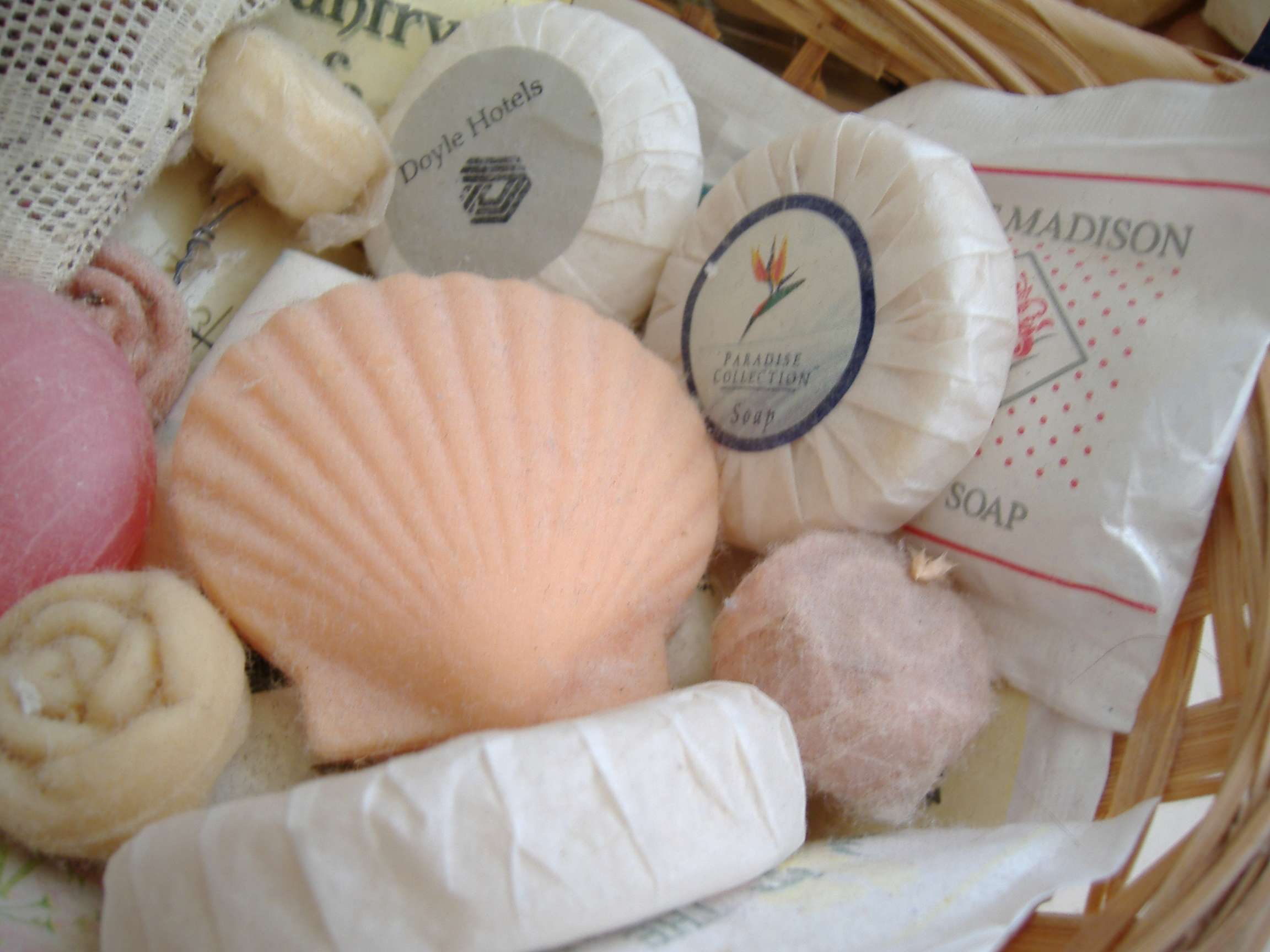
A collection of decorative bar soaps that are often found in hotels

=== Toilet soaps ===
Structure of a micelle, a cell-like structure formed by the aggregation of soap subunits (such as sodium stearate): The exterior of the micelle is hydrophilic (attracted to water) and the interior is lipophilic (attracted to oils).

In a domestic setting, "soap" usually refers to what is technically called a "toilet soap", used for household and personal cleaning. Toilet soaps are salts of fatty acids with the general formula (RCOO^{−})M^{+}, where M is Sodium (Na) or Potassium (K).

When used for cleaning, soap solubilizes particles and grime, that can then be separated from the article being cleaned. The insoluble oil/fat "dirt" becomes associated inside micelles, which are tiny spheres formed from soap molecules with polar hydrophilic (water-attracting) groups on the outside and encasing a lipophilic (fat-attracting) pocket, that shields the oil/fat molecules from the water, making them soluble. Anything that is soluble will be washed away with the water. In hand washing, as a surfactant, when lathered with a little water, soap kills microorganisms by disorganizing their membrane lipid bilayer and denaturing their proteins. It also emulsifies oils, enabling them to be carried away by running water.

When used in hard water, soap does not lather well, but forms soap scum (related to metallic soaps, see below).

=== Non-toilet soaps ===
So-called metallic soaps are key components of most lubricating greases and thickeners. A commercially important example is lithium stearate. Greases are usually emulsions of calcium soap or lithium soap and mineral oil. Many other metallic soaps are also useful, including those of aluminium, sodium, and mixtures thereof. Such soaps are also used as thickeners to increase the viscosity of oils. In ancient times, lubricating greases were made by the addition of lime to olive oil, which would produce calcium soaps. Metal soaps are also included in modern artists' oil paints formulations as a rheology modifier. Metal soaps can be prepared by neutralizing fatty acids with metal oxides:

2 RCOOH + CaO → (RCOO)_{2}Ca + H_{2}O

A cation from an organic base such as ammonium can be used instead of a metal. Ammonium nonanoate is an ammonium-based soap that is used as a herbicide.

Another class of non-toilet soaps are resin soaps, which are produced in the paper industry by the action of tree rosin with alkaline reagents used to separate cellulose from raw wood. A major component of such soaps is the sodium salt of abietic acid. Resin soaps are used as emulsifiers.

== Soapmaking ==
The production of toilet soaps usually entails the saponification of triglycerides, which are vegetable or animal oils and fats. An alkaline solution (often lye) induces saponification whereby the triglyceride fats first hydrolyze into salts of fatty acids. Glycerol (glycerin) is then liberated. The glycerin is sometimes left in the soap product as a softening agent, making the soap itself softer, although it is occasionally separated. The addition of glycerol and the processing of this soap produces glycerin soap.

=== Additives ===
Sand or pumice may be added to produce a scouring soap. The scouring agents serve to remove dead cells from the skin surface being cleaned. This process is called exfoliation.

To make antibacterial soap, compounds such as triclosan or triclocarban can be added. There is some concern that use of antibacterial soaps and other products might encourage antimicrobial resistance in microorganisms.

The type of alkali metal used determines the kind of soap product. Sodium soaps prepared from sodium hydroxide (soda lye) are firm, whereas potassium soaps, derived from potassium hydroxide (potash lye), are softer or often liquid. Historically, potassium hydroxide was extracted from the ashes of bracken or other plants. Lithium soaps also tend to be hard and are used almost exclusively in greases.

For making toilet soaps, triglycerides (oils and fats) are derived from coconut, olive, or palm oils, as well as tallow. Triglyceride is the chemical name for the triesters of fatty acids and glycerin. Tallow, rendered fat, is the most available triglyceride from animals. Hence, the fat compound in many soaps is known as sodium tallowate. Each species offers quite different fatty acid content, resulting in soaps of distinct feel. The seed oils give softer but milder soaps. Soap made from pure olive oil, sometimes called Castile soap or Marseille soap, is reputed for its particular mildness. The term "Castile" is also sometimes applied to soaps from a mixture of oils with a high percentage of olive oil.

Most soaps for body washing are "refatted" or "superfatted". Superfatting agents can achieve multiple goals. First, superfatting ensures the absence of lye in the soap. For cake soaps, superfatting confers plasticity, which prevents cracking. Finally, superfats replenish (refat) the skin oils that are washed away during the cleansing process. Typical superfatting agents are lecithins, lanolin, and various alkanolamides. Handmade soap can be refatted using fat or coconut oil beyond that needed to consume the alkali used (in a cold-pour process, this excess fat is called "superfatting"), and the glycerol left in acts as a moisturizing agent. Superfatted soap is more skin-friendly than one without extra fat, although it can leave a "greasy" feel. An emollient is sometimes added, such as jojoba oil or shea butter.

Fatty acid content of various fats used for soapmaking
Fats	Lauric acid	Myristic acid	Palmitic acid	Stearic acid	Oleic acid	Linoleic acid	Linolenic acid
Fats	C_{12} saturated	C_{14} saturated	C_{16} saturated	C_{18} saturated	C_{18} monounsaturated	C_{18} diunsaturated	C_{18} triunsaturated
Tallow	0	4	28	23	35	2	1
Coconut oil	48	18	9	3	7	2	0
Palm kernel oil	46	16	8	3	12	2	0
Palm oil	0	1	44	4	37	9	0
Laurel oil	54	0	0	0	15	17	0
Olive oil	0	0	11	2	78	10	0
Canola oil	0	1	3	2	58	9	23

== Gallery ==
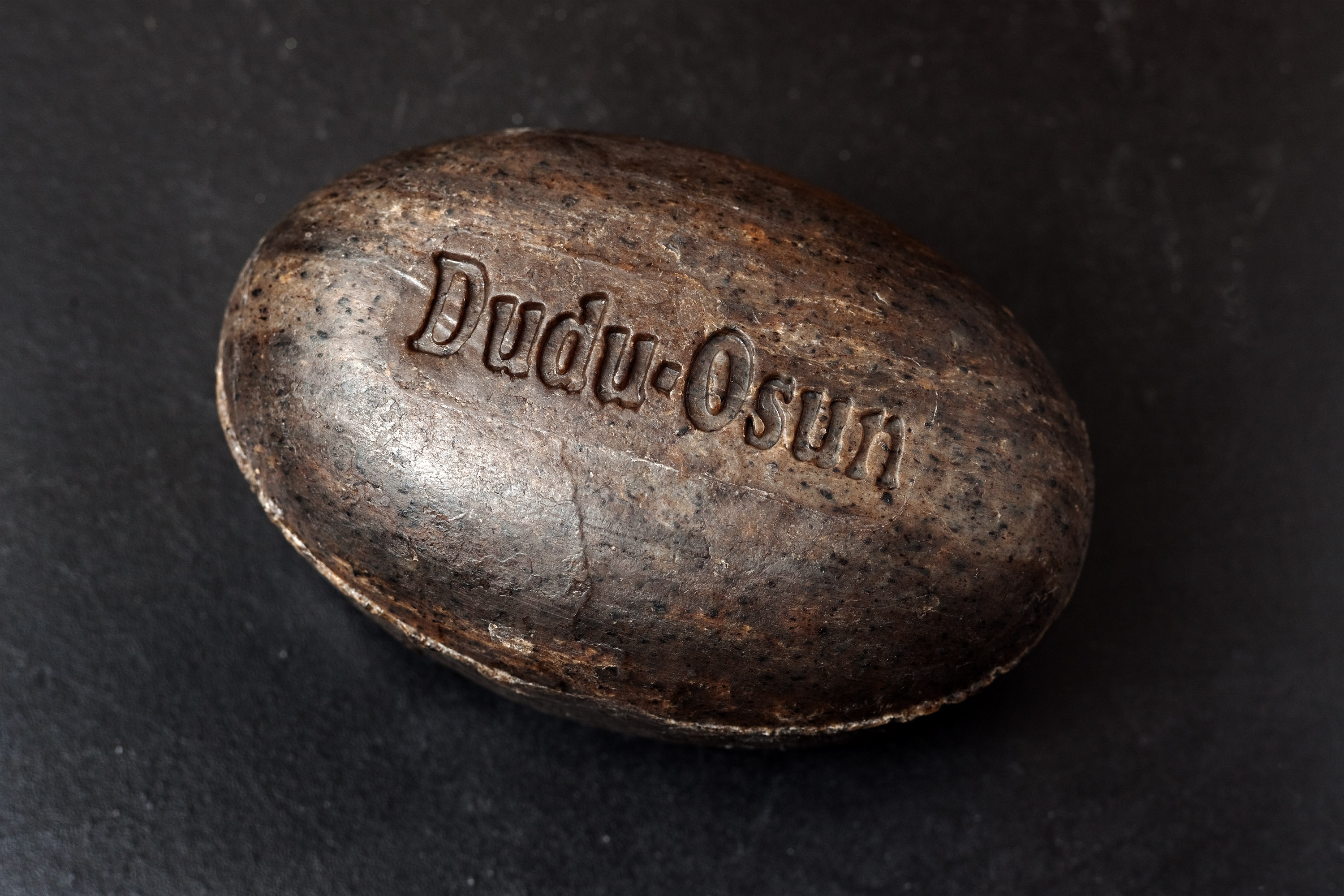
Dudu-Osun – a popular type of African black soap

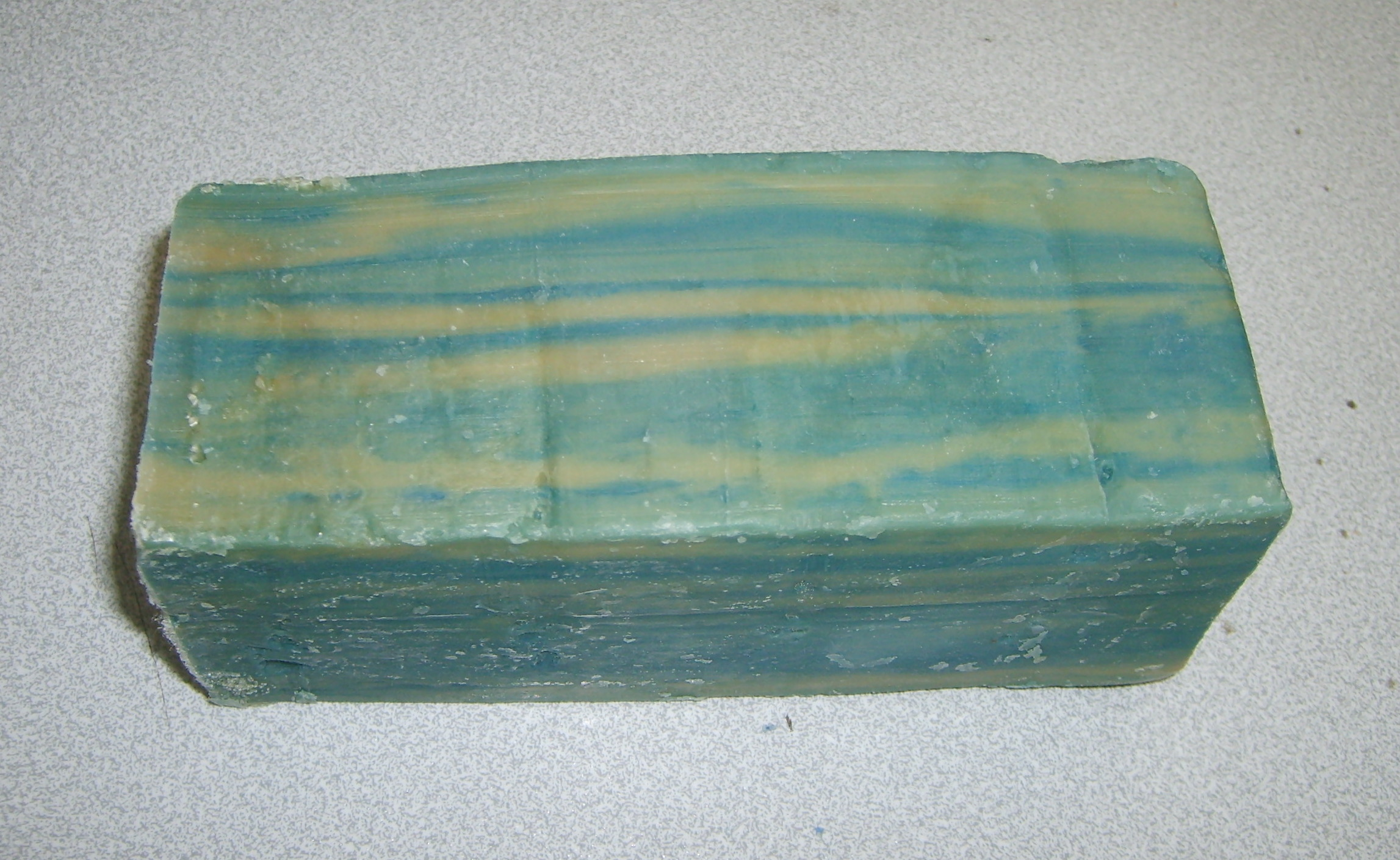
Azul e branco soap – a bar of blue-white soap

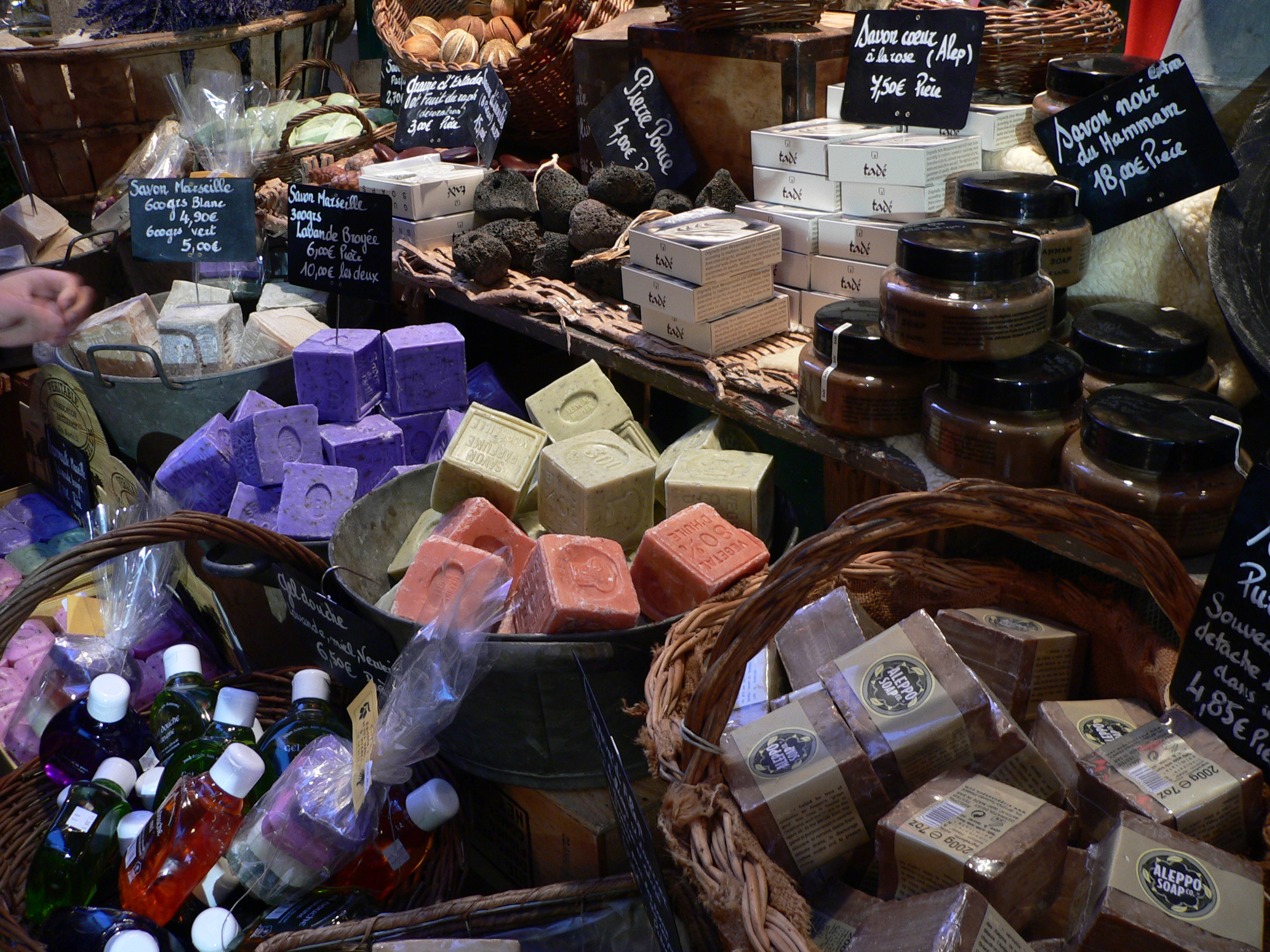
Handmade soaps sold at a shop in Hyères, France

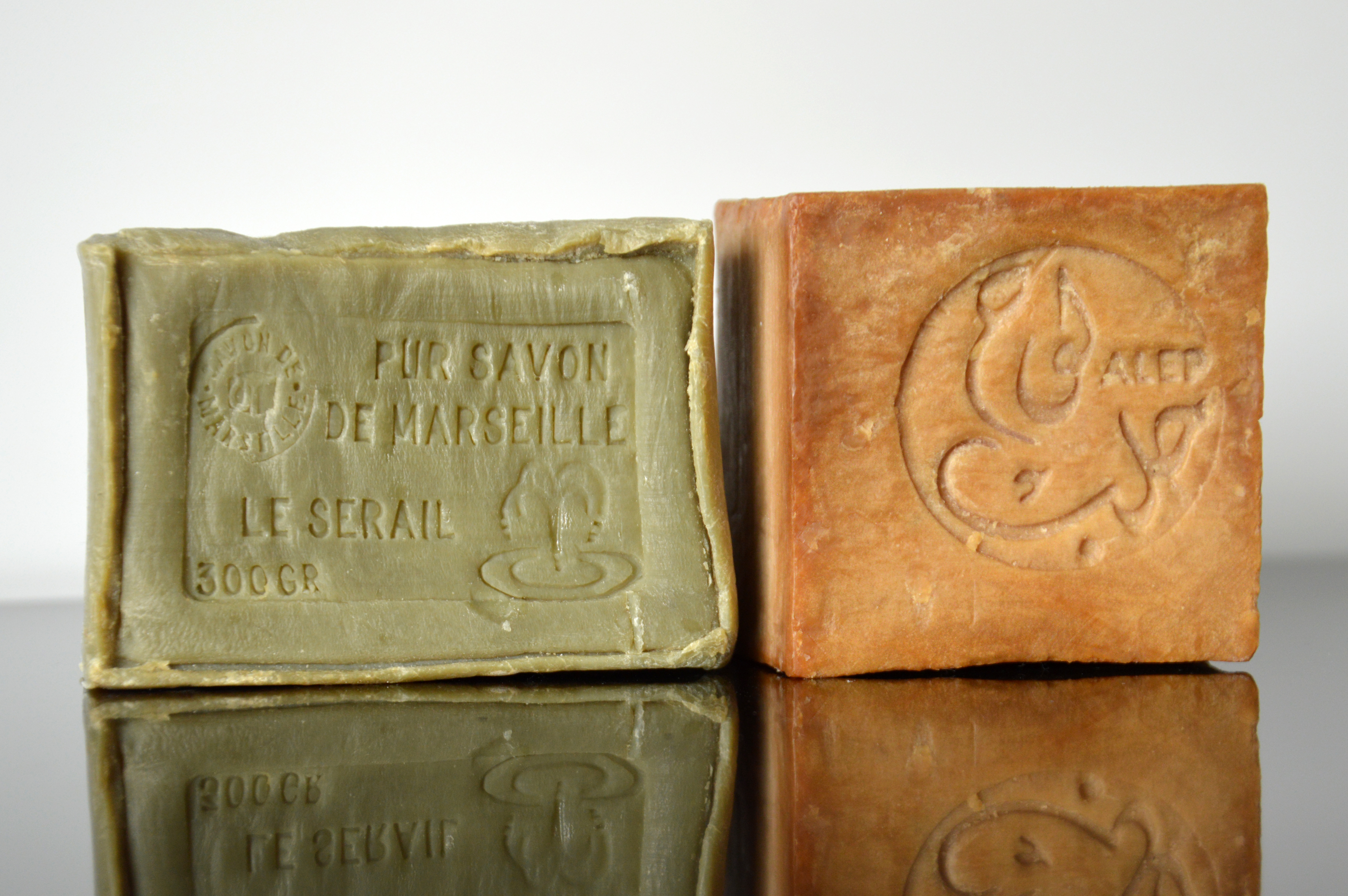
Traditional Marseille soap (left) and Aleppo soap (right)

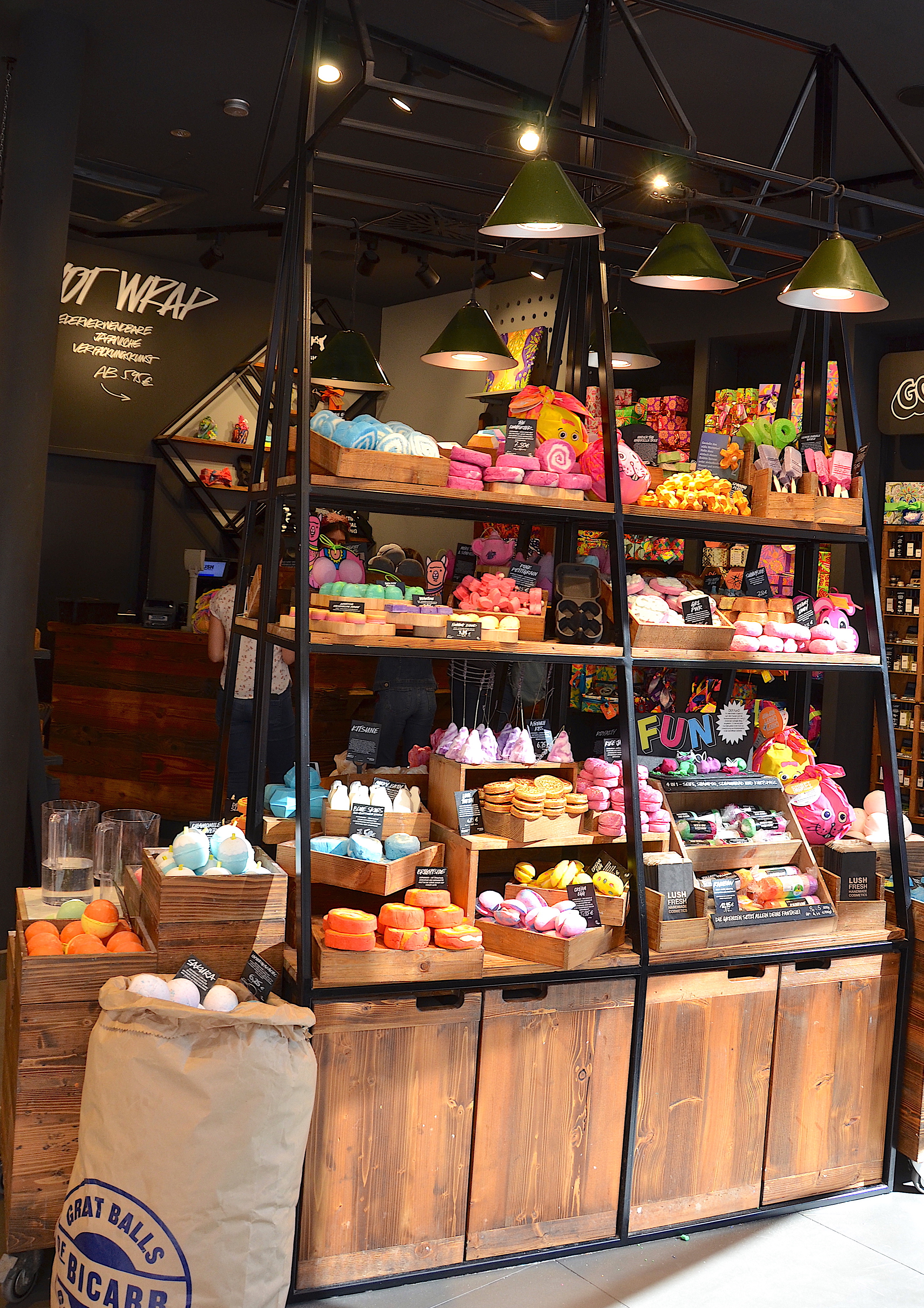
Modern soap shop in Tübingen (2019)

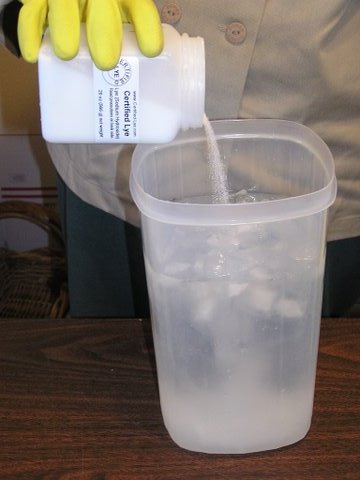
Lye being dissolved in water for soapmaking

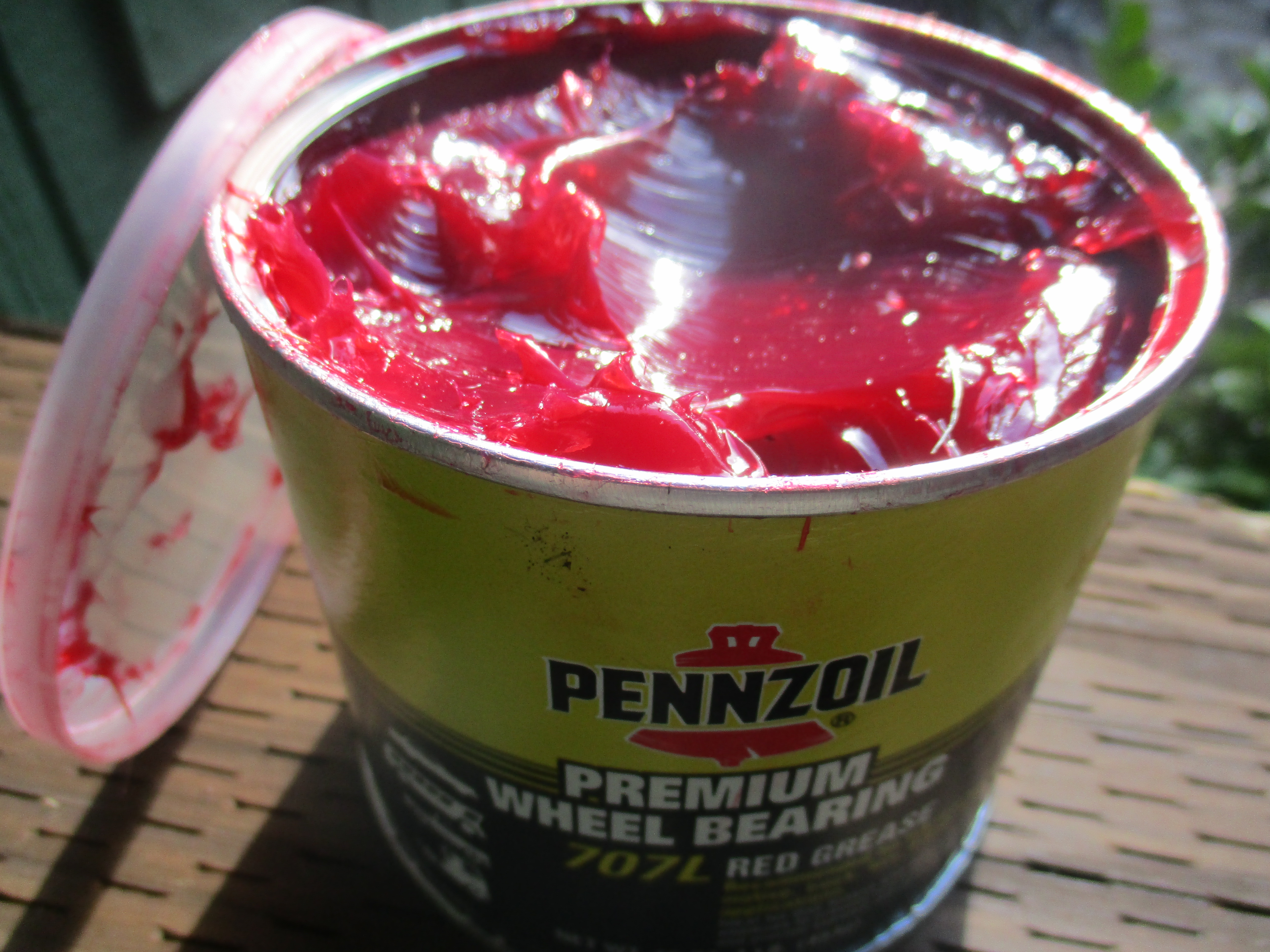
Greases for automotive applications contain soaps.

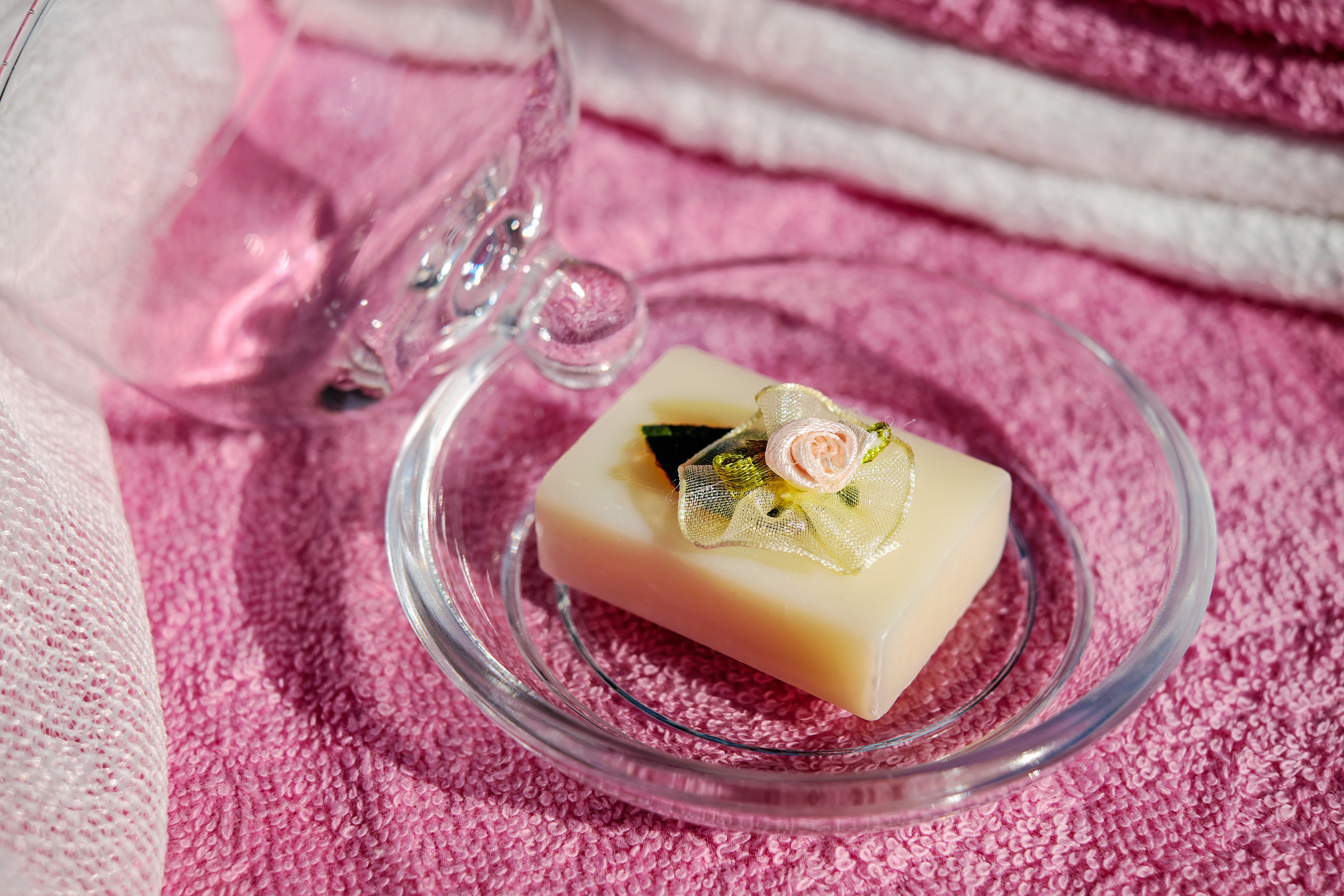
Soap on a dish

== History ==
=== Ancient world ===
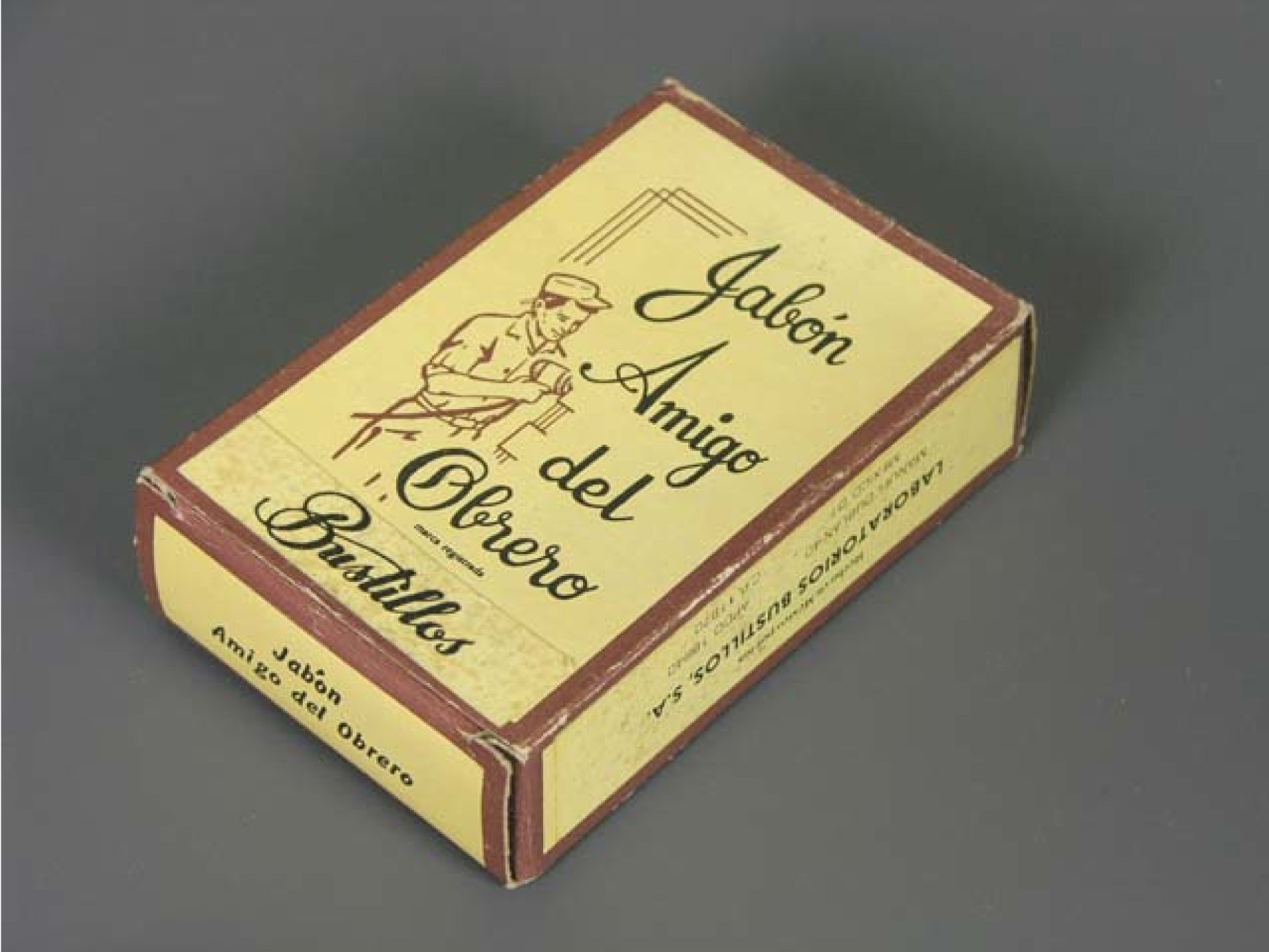
Twentieth century packaging of Amigo del Obrero (Worker's Friend) soap, part of the Museo del Objeto del Objeto collection

Proto-soaps, which mixed fat and alkali and were used for cleansing, are mentioned in Sumerian, Babylonian, and Egyptian texts.

The earliest recorded evidence of the production of soap-like materials dates back to c. 2800 BC in ancient Babylon. A formula for making a soap-like substance was written on a Sumerian clay tablet c. 2500 BC. This was produced by heating a mixture of oil and wood ash, the earliest recorded chemical reaction, and used for washing woolen clothing.

The Ebers papyrus (Egypt, c. 1550 BC) indicates the ancient Egyptians used a soap-like product as a medicine and created this by combining animal fats or vegetable oils with a soda ash substance called trona. Egyptian documents mention a similar substance was used in the preparation of wool for weaving.

In the reign of Nabonidus (556–539 BC), a recipe for a soap-like substance consisted of uhulu (ashes), cypress [oil], and sesame [seed oil] "for washing the stones for the servant girls".

True soaps, which might be recognised as soaps today, were different from proto-soaps. They foamed, were made deliberately, and could be produced in a hard or soft form because of an understanding of lye sources. It is uncertain who invented true soap, which may have been independently invented by various societies.

Knowledge of how to produce true soap emerged at some point between early mentions of proto-soaps and the first century AD. Alkali was used to clean textiles such as wool for thousands of years, but soap forms only when there is enough fat, and experiments show that washing wool does not create visible quantities of soap. Experiments by Sally Pointer show that the repeated laundering of materials used in perfume-making lead to noticeable amounts of soap forming. This fits with other evidence from Mesopotamian culture.

The ancient Romans did not use soap till at least the first century AD. At that time, the preferred Roman method of cleaning the body was to massage oil into the skin and then scrape away both the oil and any dirt with a strigil, whose standard design was a curved blade with a handle, all made of metal. Pliny the Elder, whose writings chronicle first-century life, describes soap as "an invention of the Gauls".

The word sapo, Latin for soap, has connected to a mythical Mount Sapo, a hill near the River Tiber where animals were sacrificed, but in all likelihood, the word was borrowed from an early Germanic language and is cognate with Latin sebum, "tallow". It first appears in Pliny the Elder's account, Historia Naturalis, which discusses the manufacture of soap from tallow and ashes. There he mentions its use in the treatment of scrofulous sores, as well as among the Gauls as a dye to redden hair that the men in Germania were more likely to use than women. The Romans avoided washing with harsh soaps before encountering the milder soaps used by the Gauls c. 58 BC Aretaeus of Cappadocia, writing in the second century AD, observes among "Celts, which are men called Gauls, those alkaline substances that are made into balls [...] called soap".. The Gauls with whom the Cappadocian would have been familiar are those of Anatolian Galatia.

Galen, a second-century AD physician, describes soap-making using lye and prescribes washing to carry away impurities from the body and clothes. The use of soap for personal cleanliness became increasingly common in this period. According to Galen, the best soaps were Germanic. He indicated that soaps from Gaul were second best. Zosimos of Panopolis, c. 300 AD, describes soap and soap-making.

In the Southern Levant, the ashes from barilla plants, such as species of Salsola, saltwort (Seidlitzia rosmarinus), and Anabasis, were used to make potash, which was cooked with oil into soap. Olive oil was traditionally used instead of animal fat throughout the Levant and was boiled in a copper cauldron for several days. As the boiling progressed, alkali ashes and smaller quantities of quicklime were added and constantly stirred. In the case of fat, it required constant stirring while kept tepid until it began to trace. Once it began to thicken, the brew was poured into a mold and left to cool and harden for two weeks. After hardening, it was cut into smaller cakes. Aromatic herbs were often added to the rendered soap to impart their fragrance, such as yarrow leaves, lavender, and germander.

=== Ancient China ===
A detergent similar to soap was manufactured in ancient China from the seeds of Gleditsia sinensis. Use of it in China as a detergent is documented for more than 2,000 years. Another traditional detergent is a mixture of pig pancreas and plant ash called zhuyizi (simplified Chinese: 猪胰子; traditional Chinese: 豬胰子; pinyin: zhūyízǐ). Soap made of animal fat did not appear in China until the modern era. Soap-like detergents were not as popular as ointments and creams.

=== Islamic Golden Age ===
Hard toilet soap with a pleasant smell was produced in West Asia and North Africa during the Islamic Golden Age, when soap-making became an established industry. Recipes for soap-making are described by Muhammad ibn Zakariya al-Razi (c. 865–925 AD), who also gave a recipe for producing glycerine from olive oil. In West Asia, soap was produced from the interaction of fatty oils and fats with alkali. In Syria, soap was produced using olive oil together with alkali and lime. Soap was exported from Syria to other parts of the Muslim world and to Europe.

A twelfth-century document describes the process of soap production. It mentions the key ingredient, alkali, which later became crucial to modern chemistry, derived from al-qaly or "ashes".

By the thirteenth century, the manufacture of soap in West Asia and North Africa had become a major cottage industry, with sources in Nablus, Fes, Damascus, and Aleppo.

=== Medieval Europe ===
Soapmakers in Naples (then under the control of the Eastern Roman Empire) were members of a guild in the late sixth century, and in the eighth century, soap-making was well known in Italy and Spain. The Carolingian capitulary De Villis, dating to c. 800 AD, representing the royal will of Charlemagne, mentions soap as being one of the products the stewards of royal estates are to tally. The lands of Medieval Spain were a leading soapmaker by 800 AD, and soapmaking began in the Kingdom of England c. 1200 AD. Soapmaking is mentioned both as "women's work" and as the produce of "good workmen" alongside other necessities, such as the produce of carpenters, blacksmiths, and bakers.

In Europe, soap in the 9th century was produced from animal fats and had an unpleasant smell. This changed when olive oil began to be used in soap formulas instead, after which much of Europe's soap production moved to the Mediterranean olive-growing regions. Hard toilet soap was introduced to Europe by Arabs and gradually spread as a luxury item. It was often perfumed.

By the 15th century, the manufacture of soap in Christendom frequently took place on an industrial scale, with sources in Antwerp, Castile, Marseille, Naples and Venice.

=== 16th–17th century ===
In France, by the second half of the 16th century, the semi-industrialized professional manufacture of soap was concentrated in a few centers of Provence—Toulon, Hyères, and Marseille—which supplied the rest of France. In Marseilles, by 1525, production was concentrated in at least two factories, and soap production at Marseille tended to eclipse the other Provençal centers.

English manufacture tended to concentrate in London. The demand for high-quality hard soap was significant enough during the Tudor period that barrels of ashes were imported for the manufacture of soap.

Finer soaps were later produced in Europe from the 17th century, using vegetable oils (like olive oil) as opposed to animal fats. Many of these soaps are still produced, both industrially and by small-scale artisans. Castile soap is a popular example of the vegetable-only soaps derived from the oldest "white soap" of Italy. In 1634, Charles I granted the newly formed Society of Soapmakers a monopoly in soap production who produced certificates from 'foure Countesses, and five Viscountesses, and divers other Ladies and Gentlewomen of great credite and quality, besides common Laundresses and others', testifying that 'the New White Soap washeth whiter and sweeter than the Old Soap'.

During the Restoration era (February 1665 – August 1714) a soap tax was introduced in England, which meant that until the mid-1800s, soap was a luxury, only used regularly by the well-to-do. The soap manufacturing process was closely supervised by revenue officials who made sure that soapmakers' equipment was kept under lock and key when not being supervised. Moreover, soap could not be produced by small makers because of a law which stipulated that soap boilers must manufacture a minimum quantity of one imperial ton at each boiling, placing the process beyond the reach of the average person. The soap trade was boosted and deregulated when the tax was repealed in 1853.

=== Modern period ===
Industrially manufactured bar soaps became available in the late 18th century, as advertising campaigns in Europe and America promoted popular awareness of the relationship between cleanliness and health. In modern times, the use of soap has become commonplace in industrialized nations due to a better understanding of the role of hygiene in reducing pathogenic microorganisms.

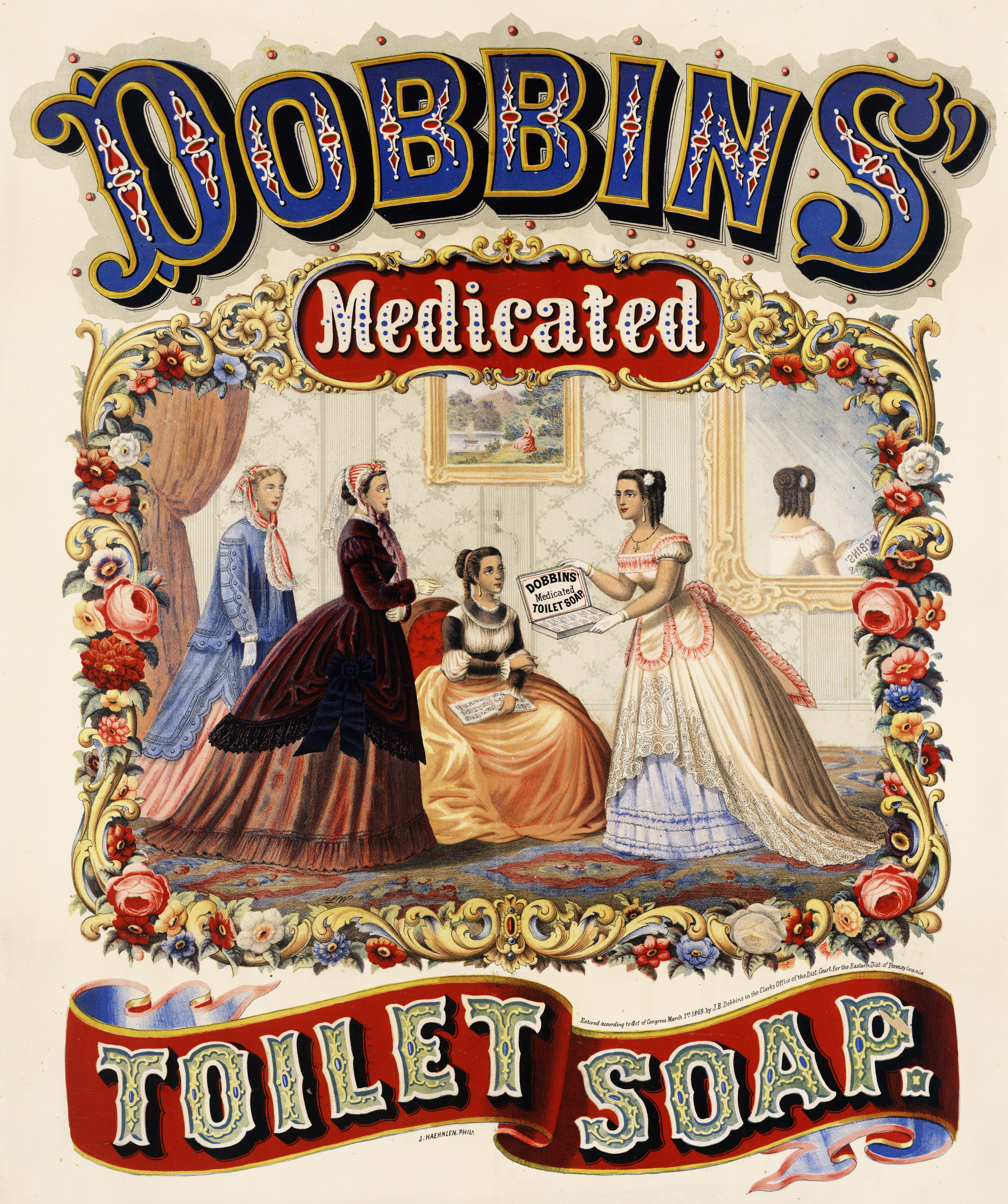
Advertising for Dobbins' medicated toilet soap

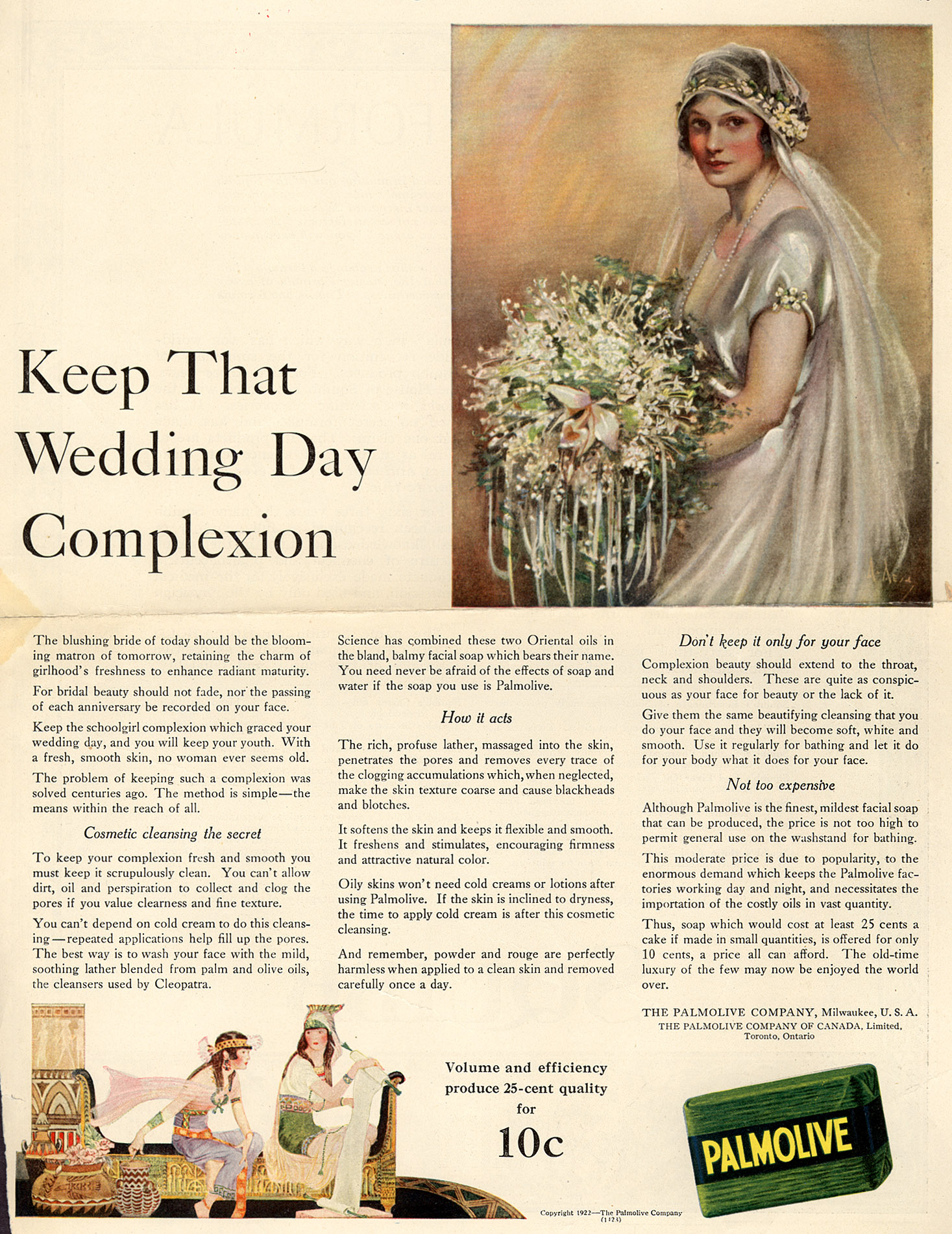
A 1922 magazine advertisement for Palmolive Soap

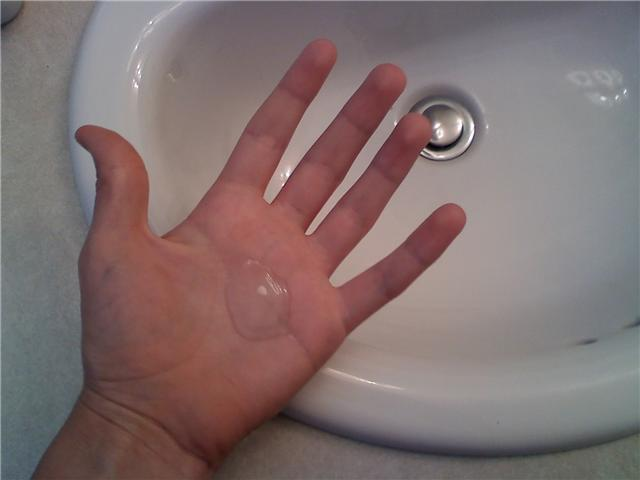
Liquid soap

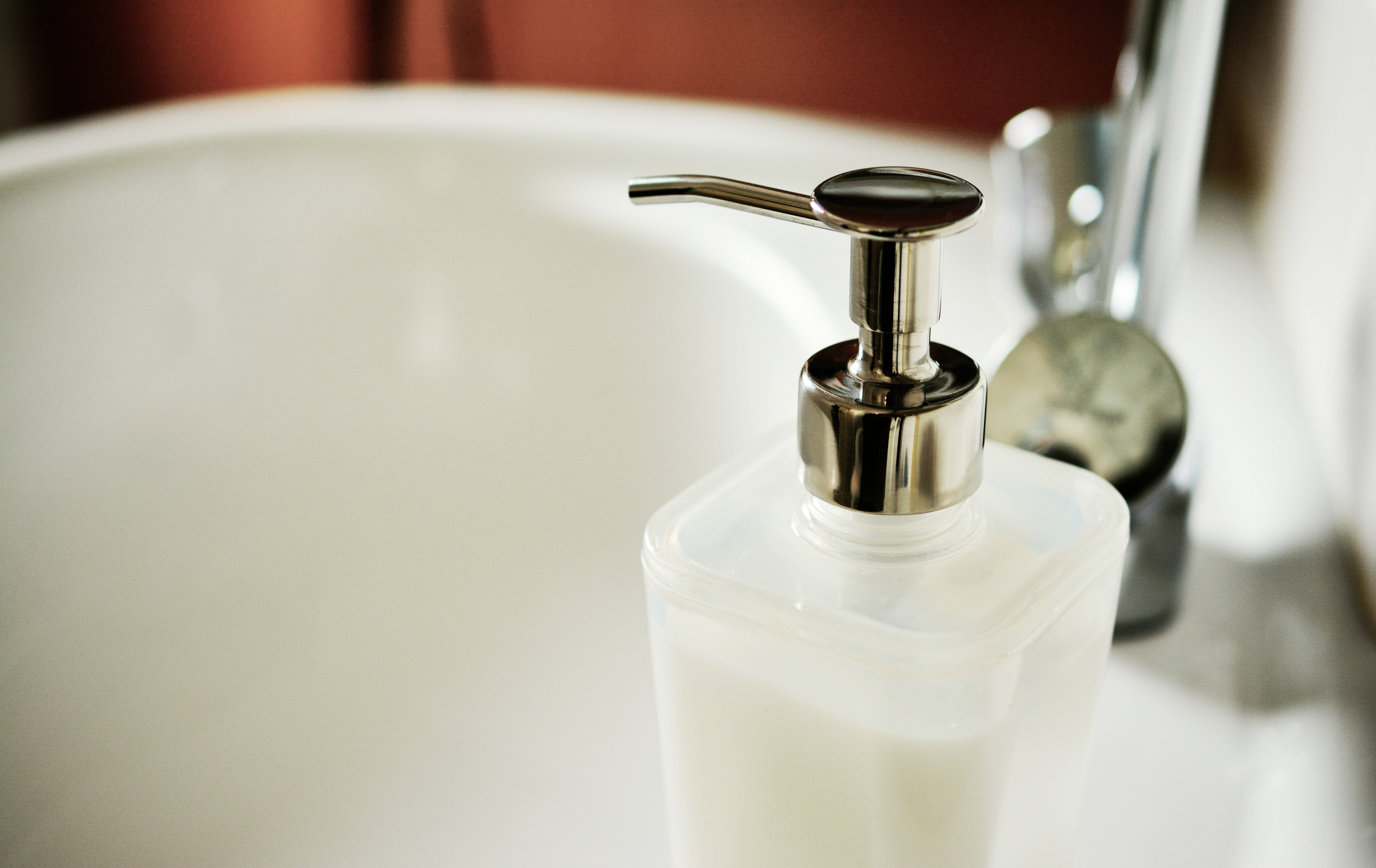
A soap dispenser

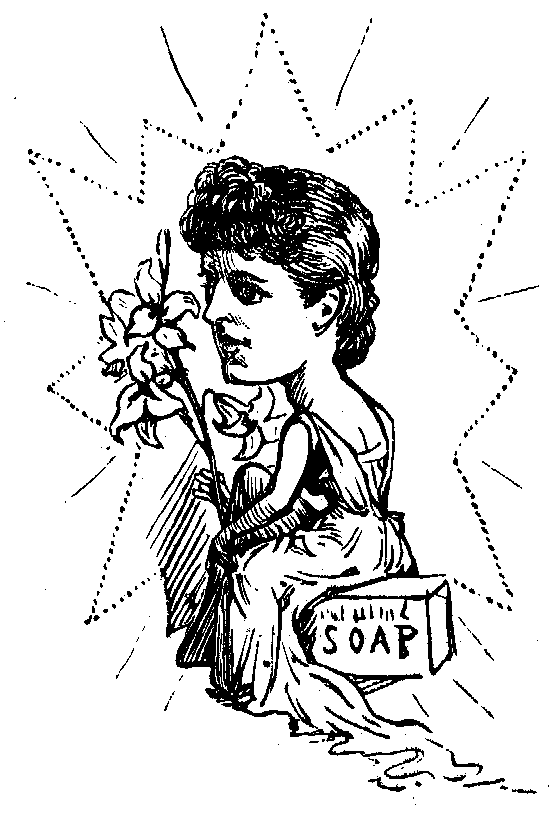
Caricature of Lillie Langtry, from Punch, Christmas 1890: The soap box on which she sits reflects her endorsements of cosmetics and soaps.

Until the Industrial Revolution, soapmaking was conducted on a small scale and the product was rough. In 1780, James Keir established a chemical works at Tipton, for the manufacture of alkali from the sulfates of potash and soda, to which he afterwards added a soap manufactory. The method of extraction proceeded on a discovery of Keir's. In 1790, Nicolas Leblanc discovered how to make alkali from common salt. Andrew Pears started making a high-quality, transparent soap, Pears soap, in 1807 in London. His son-in-law, Thomas J. Barratt, became the brand manager (the first of its kind) for Pears in 1865. In 1882, Barratt recruited English actress and socialite Lillie Langtry to become the poster-girl for Pears soap, making her the first celebrity to endorse a commercial product.

William Gossage produced low-priced, good-quality soap from the 1850s. Robert Spear Hudson began manufacturing a soap powder in 1837, initially by grinding the soap with a mortar and pestle. American manufacturer Benjamin T. Babbitt introduced marketing innovations that included the sale of bar soap and distribution of product samples. William Hesketh Lever and his brother, James, bought a small soap works in Warrington in 1886 and founded what is still one of the largest soap businesses, formerly called Lever Brothers and now called Unilever. These soap businesses were among the first to employ large-scale advertising campaigns.

=== Liquid soap ===
Liquid soap was invented in the nineteenth century. In 1865, William Sheppard patented a liquid version of soap. In 1898, B.J. Johnson developed a soap derived from palm and olive oils. His company, the B.J. Johnson Soap Company, introduced "Palmolive" brand soap that same year. This new brand of soap became popular rapidly, and to such a degree that B.J. Johnson Soap Company changed its name to Palmolive.

In the early 1900s, other companies began to develop their own liquid soaps. Products like Pine-Sol and Tide appeared on the market, making the process of cleaning things other than skin, such as clothing, floors, and bathrooms, much easier.

Liquid soap also works better for more traditional or non-machine washing methods, such as using a washboard.

== See also ==
- List of soap-makers

=== Soap-related ===
- Dishwashing soap
- Disinfectant
- Foam
- Hand washing
- List of cleaning products
- Palm oil
- Personal grooming
- Sanitation
- Shampoo
- Shower gel
- Soap bubble
- Soap dish
- Soap dispenser
- Soap made from human corpses
- Soap plant
- Soap substitute
- Soapwort
- Toothpaste
