= Vandoren =

Instrument accessory manufacturer

Vandoren is a manufacturer of mouthpieces, reeds, and accessories for the clarinet and saxophone families.

== History ==
Vandoren was founded in 1905 by Eugène Van Doren (1873-1940), a clarinetist for the Paris Opera. The original location was eventually moved to 56 Rue Lepic, Paris, where his son, Robert Van Doren (1904-1996), took over the business around 1935 and designed the 5RV mouthpiece.

In 1967, Bernard Van Doren (b. 1945), grandson of the aforementioned Eugène Van Doren, took over the company and designed the B45 clarinet mouthpiece. Bernard also introduced new machinery to the company, and moved the factory to its current location in Paris at Bormes les Mimosas in 1990. With the improvements in technology, Vandoren was able to increase production, becoming a major manufacturer of reeds and mouthpieces for woodwind instruments.

== Mouthpieces ==
Vandoren clarinet and saxophone mouthpieces are made of vulcanised rubber called ebonite. Their V16 tenor saxophone mouthpieces are also available in a metal variant.

== Reeds ==
The company produces clarinet reeds in a variety of styles for French, German and Austrian style clarinets.

=== French styled clarinet reeds ===
Traditional reeds (blue packaging) are the most widely played style of reed. They are available in strengths from 1.5 to 5. They are made with a .09 mm thickness at the tip and a thickness of 2.8 mm at the heel. Vandoren V.12 reeds are produced from the thicker cane that is used to make saxophone reeds. At the tip, V.12 reeds have a thickness of .10 mm and at the heel, they have a thickness of 3.15 mm. This is equal to .124 inches, which is where the name V.12 comes from. The V.12 reeds come in strengths from 2.5 to 5. These strengths do not correspond to those of Vandoren traditional reeds (a strength 4 V.12 has a similar hardness to a strength 3.5 traditional reed). The V12 reed produces a darker tone than the traditional reed.

The 56 rue Lepic reeds (black packaging) are named after the address of the Vandoren central offices on 56 rue Lepic, Paris. They differ from the other two types of Vandoren reeds in that they come from the thickest cane. At the tip, 56 rue Lepic reeds have a thickness of .11 mm and at the heel, they have a thickness of 3.25 mm. They are very similar to German style reeds. V21 reeds were released from in 2015. They combine the shape of a 56 rue Lepic reed with a V.12 profile.

=== German styled clarinet reeds ===
The White Master is designed for German clarinet players, respectively. Their cut is calculated to suit the characteristics of the German system clarinet mouthpieces. Black Master reeds have a larger and thicker cut than White Master reeds.

=== Austrian styled clarinet reeds ===
The Black Master is designed for Austrian clarinet players. They are available in two different models. The Black Master reed is designed for Austrian mouthpieces. This cut can also suit the Boehm system mouthpieces. The Black Master Traditional reed is designed in the tradition of the Viennese School for very closed Austrian mouthpieces with a long facing.

=== Saxophone reeds ===
Like clarinet reeds, Vandoren saxophone reeds come in a variety of styles. The most basic style is the Traditional reed (also known as the "Blue Box" reed), which is very similar to the Traditional clarinet reed. It features a thin tip and a strong heart. Although the Traditional reed is seen as a "classical" saxophone reed, it is extremely versatile and is used by many saxophonists in a variety of musical styles.

The JAVA reed, available in filed and unfiled varieties, is for playing jazz: the filed JAVA Red cut is more flexible with a slightly stronger tonal body than the original (green, unfiled) JAVA cut. In 1993, Vandoren began producing V16 reeds, also for jazz, which have a thicker tip and a longer pallet than the JAVAs. The ZZ is also intended for jazz.

Vandoren released in 2009 the V12 for classical music which is modeled after the success of the Vandoren V12 reed for clarinet. Then in 2016, the V21 reeds, a versatile model for various styles of music.

== Accessories ==
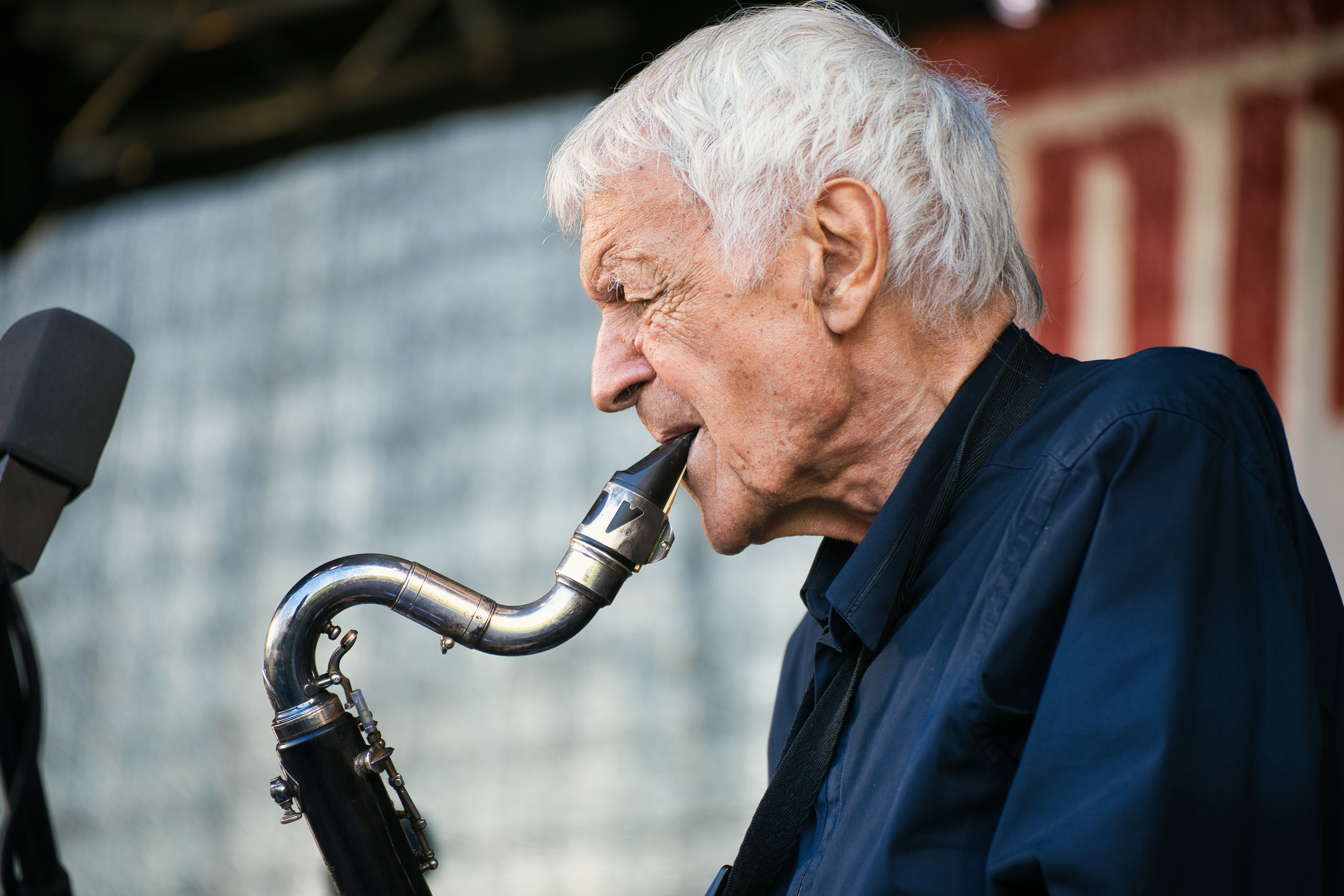
Michel Portal with a Vandoren Optimum ligature for bass clarinet (2021)

Vandoren has a large range of accessories for clarinet and saxophone: these include ligatures, reed cases, cleaning swabs, mouthpiece cushions and cork grease, and even instrument harnesses and neck straps. Some other accessories include mouthpiece pouches, reed trimmers and reed resurfacers.

Saxophone and clarinet ligatures

Vandoren produces a wide range of ligatures for clarinet and saxophone players. They are made from materials such as metal, leather, and woven materials. These ligatures can be found for the B♭ clarinet, Bass clarinet, E♭ clarinet, and Alto clarinet. The same materials are used for saxophonists and can be found for the soprano saxophone, alto saxophone, tenor saxophone and baritone saxophone. Vandoren's Optimum, M/O, Klassik ligature, and leather ligature are all available for the clarinet and saxophone families.
