= Lithium 12-hydroxystearate =

Names
- IUPAC name Lithium 12-hydroxyoctadecanoate

Identifiers
CAS Number	7620-77-1
3D model (JSmol)	Interactive image
ChemSpider	99662
ECHA InfoCard	100.028.669
PubChem CID	111018
UNII	AO71K6FGH8
CompTox Dashboard (EPA)	DTXSID9027655
- InChI: InChI=1S/C18H36O3.Li/c1-2-3-4-11-14-17(19)15-12-9-7-5-6-8-10-13-16-18(20)21;/h17,19H,2-16H2,1H3,(H,20,21);/q;+1/p-1
- SMILES: [Li+].[O-]C(=O)CCCCCCCCCCC(O)CCCCCC

Properties
Chemical formula	C_{18}H_{35}LiO_{3}
Molar mass	306.42 g·mol^{−1}
Appearance	White powder
Melting point	> 200 °C (392 °F; 473 K)
- Except where otherwise noted, data are given for materials in their standard state (at 25 °C [77 °F], 100 kPa). Infobox references

Lithium 12-hydroxystearate is an organic compound with the formula CH_{3}(CH_{2})_{5}CH(OH)(CH_{2})_{10}CO_{2}Li. It is classified as a lithium soap, i.e., the lithium salt of the fatty acid 12-hydroxystearic acid. Like most lithium soaps, it a soft white solid. Lithium soaps are key component of many lubricating greases.

== Use ==
Lithium 12-hydroxystearate is a component of commercial greases. It exhibits high oxidation stability and a dropping point up to around 200 °C. Most greases used in motor vehicles, aircraft, and heavy machinery contain lithium stearates, mainly lithium 12-hydroxystearate. For applications, lithium 12-hydroxystearate is usually dispersed in synthetic oils such as silicone oil and ester oil. The synthetic oils are preferred for their greater stability and ability to perform at extreme temperatures.

== Production ==
Lithium soaps manufactured by hydrolysis of hydrogenated castor oil. The hydrogenation process converts ricinoleate moieties in castor oil triglycerides to 12-hydroxystearates. Samples typically consist of a mixture of lithium 12-hydroxystearate and lithium stearate.

Lithium 12-hydroxystearate can also be prepared by combining lithium hydroxide and 12-hydroxystearic acid. Since these lithium soaps are difficult to filter, they are collected by spray drying.
