= Lithium stearate =

Names
- Preferred IUPAC name Lithium octadecanoate

Identifiers
CAS Number	4485-12-5
3D model (JSmol)	Interactive image
ChemSpider	19369
ECHA InfoCard	100.022.521
EC Number	224-772-5
PubChem CID	20569
UNII	P31MC94P70
CompTox Dashboard (EPA)	DTXSID2029666
- InChI: InChI=1S/C18H36O2.Li/c1-2-3-4-5-6-7-8-9-10-11-12-13-14-15-16-17-18(19)20;/h2-17H2,1H3,(H,19,20);/q;+1/p-1
- SMILES: [Li+].[O-]C(=O)CCCCCCCCCCCCCCCCC

Properties
Chemical formula	C_{18}H_{35}LiO_{2}
Molar mass	290.42 g·mol^{−1}
- Except where otherwise noted, data are given for materials in their standard state (at 25 °C [77 °F], 100 kPa). Infobox references

Lithium stearate is a chemical compound with the formula LiO_{2}C(CH_{2})_{16}CH_{3}. It is formally classified as a soap (a salt of a fatty acid). Lithium stearate is a white soft solid, prepared by the reaction of lithium hydroxide and stearic acid.

Lithium stearate and lithium 12-hydroxystearate are lithium soaps, and are components of lithium greases and release agents.
