= Cork grease =

Lubricant for wooden musical instruments

Cork grease is a lubricant for woodwind and reed instruments such as saxophones, clarinets, bassoons, and oboes. These instruments are designed to be disassembled into parts for easy storage and portability, and the joints between parts feature cork seals. Cork grease is used on these seals to ease and lubricate instrument assembly, avoiding damage to the cork and the instrument's barrel. Cork grease also acts as a preservative, keeping the wooden cork moist and thick, in turn ensuring a good seal between parts of the instrument so that no air may leak through the joints upon playing. Cork grease can help woodwind players adjust their instruments' tuning pieces (e.g. barrels, necks, bocals, staples) in respect to their pitch.

Cork grease is made with ingredients such as elm extract, organic sunflower oil, coconut oil and hemp seed oil. In the past it was made from animal fat. It is probably not toxic to humans.

Other Uses: Although it is not recommended, cork grease can be used for things other than a lubricant. It can be used as a component in the sport Cork Kick, as well as a substitute for ChapStick in a pinch
