= Dropping point =

Property of grease

The dropping point of a lubricating grease is an indication of the heat resistance of the grease and is the temperature at which it passes from a semi-solid to a liquid state under specific test conditions. It is dependent on the type of thickener used and the cohesiveness of the oil and thickener of a grease. The dropping point indicates the upper temperature limit at which a grease retains its structure though is not necessarily the maximum temperature at which a grease can be used.

Dropping point is used in combination with other testable properties to determine the suitability of greases for specific applications and for use in quality control.

== ASTM test procedure ==
The dropping point test procedures are given in ASTM standards D-566 and D-2265. The test apparatus consists of a grease cup with a small hole in the bottom, test tube, two thermometers, a container, stirring device if required and an electric heater. The inside surfaces of the grease cup are coated with the grease to be tested. A thermometer is inserted into the cup and held in place so that the thermometer does not touch the grease. This assembly is placed inside a test tube. The test tube is lowered into the container which is filled with oil in D-566 and has an aluminum block in D-2265. Another thermometer is inserted into the oil/block.

To execute a test, the oil/block is heated, while being stirred, at a rate of 8 °F (4.4 °C) to 12 °F (6.7 °C) per minute until the temperature is approximately 30 °F (17 °C) below the expected dropping point. The heat is reduced until the test tube temperature is at most 4 °F (2.2 °C) less than the oil/block temperature. Once the temperature has stabilized the sample is inserted. The dropping point is the temperature recorded on the test tube thermometer, plus a correction factor for the oil/block temperature, when a drop of grease falls through the hole in the grease cup. If the drop trails a thread, the dropping temperature is the temperature at which the thread breaks. D-2265 explains that the dropping point is useful to assist in identifying the type of grease, and for establishing and maintaining benchmarks for quality control. It adds that the results are not sufficient to assess service performance because dropping point is a static test.

== Other test procedures ==
Equivalent to D566 and D2265:

- IP 132
- ISO 2176:1995 Petroleum products—Lubricating grease—Determination of dropping point
- DIN 51806

Other:

- National Standard of People’s Republic of China GB/T 4929 “Test Methods for Dropping Point of Grease”
- S 1448(P-52)
- GOST 7134-73, Method B
- JIS K2220:2003 Lubricating grease
- DIN 51801 Dropping Point of Lubricating Grease
