= Collins oxidation =

Organic oxidation reaction

Named after	Joseph C. Collins
Reaction type	Organic redox reaction

Identifiers
RSC ontology ID	RXNO:0000550

The Collins oxidation is an organic reaction for the oxidation of primary alcohols to aldehydes. It is distinguished from other chromium oxide-based oxidations by the use of Collins reagent, a complex of chromium(VI) oxide with pyridine in dichloromethane.

Mechanism of the Collins oxidation

== Mechanism ==
The mechanism of the Collins oxidation is a relatively simple oxidation process.

Proposed mechanism of Collins oxidation

== History ==
The collins oxidation first came about in 1968 when J.C. Collins used pre-formed CrO_{3}•2Pyr dissolved in dichloromethane to oxidize alcohols. Although difficult, it was beneficial at the time because it provided an alternative to the Sarett oxidation, that used pyridine as a solvent. The Collins oxidation allowed for a less basic reagent, which in turn provided a useful option for oxidation of primary alcohols to aldehydes.

A safer variant of the Collins oxidation was discovered in 1970 by Ratcliffe and Rodehorst. The variant featured an in situ preparation of the Collins reagent by adding one equivalent of CrO_{3} over two equivalents of pyridine in dichloromethane.

== Benefits ==
The Collins oxidation is also very useful because it is cheap in comparison to its oxidizing counterparts, PCC and PDC. However, it is more difficult experimentally because of its required anhydrous conditions. The Collins oxidation is a good option when using uncomplicated substrates because it produces good yields of aldehyde and ketone products. However, as the complexity of the substrates increases, the usefulness of the Collins oxidation decreases because it lacks the selectivity that other reagents have.

== Uses ==
One of the main uses of the Collins oxidation is the transformation of alkenes to enones by adding carbonyl groups to allylic positions. While this process is very slow, it allows for alcohols to be oxidized to aldehydes or ketones without alkene interference.

The Collins oxidation can also be used to form cyclic chromate esters from 1,2-diols in order to them intramolecularly oxidize alkenes. This process can then result in the formation of highly stereoselective tetrahydrofuran.

== Related oxidation reactions ==
Several chromium oxides are used for related oxidations. These include Jones oxidation and Sarett oxidation.

== See also ==
- Jones oxidation
- Sarett oxidation
