= Oxidation with chromium(VI) complexes =

Oxidation with chromium(VI) complexes involves the conversion of alcohols to carbonyl compounds or more highly oxidized products through the action of molecular chromium(VI) oxides and salts. The principal reagents are Collins reagent, PDC, and PCC. These reagents represent improvements over inorganic chromium(VI) reagents such as Jones reagent.

== Inventory of Cr(VI)-pyridine and pyridinium reagents ==
Cr(VI)-pyridine and pyridinium reagents have the advantage that they are soluble in organic solvents as are the alcohol substrates. One family of reagents employs the complex CrO_{3}(pyridine)_{2}.

- Sarett's reagent: a solution of CrO_{3}(pyridine)_{2} in pyridine. It was popularized for selective oxidation of primary and secondary alcohols to carbonyl compounds.
- Collins reagent is a solution of the same CrO_{3}(pyridine)_{2} but in dichloromethane. The Ratcliffe variant of Collins reagent relates to details of the preparation of this solution, i.e., the addition of chromium trioxide to a solution of pyridine in methylene chloride.

The second family of reagents are salts, featuring the pyridinium cation (C_{5}H_{5}NH^{+}).

- pyridinium dichromate (PDC) is the pyridinium salt of dichromate, [Cr_{2}O_{7}]^{2-}.
- pyridinium chlorochromate (PCC) is the pyridinium salt of [CrO_{3}Cl]^{−}.

These salts are less reactive, more easily handled, and more selective than Collins reagent in oxidations of alcohols. These reagents, as well as other, more exotic adducts of nitrogen heterocycles with chromium(VI), facilitate a number of oxidative transformations of organic compounds, including cyclization to form tetrahydrofuran derivatives and allylic transposition to afford enones from allylic alcohols.

The above reagents represent improvements over the Jones reagent, a solution of chromium trioxide in aqueous sulfuric acid.

== Mechanism and stereochemistry ==
Chromate esters are implicated in these reactions. The chromate ester decomposes to the aldehyde or carbonyl by transfer of an alpha proton. Large kinetic isotope effects (k_{H}/k_{D}) are observed.

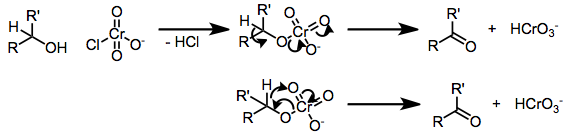

Oxidative annulation of alkenols to form six-membered rings may be accomplished with PCC. This process is postulated to occur via initial oxidation of the alcohol, attack of the alkene on the new carbonyl, then re-oxidation to a ketone. Double-bond isomerization may occur upon treatment with base as shown below.

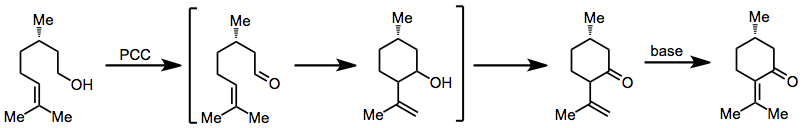

An important process mediated by chromium(VI)-amines is the oxidative transposition of tertiary allylic alcohols to give enones. The mechanism of this process likely depends on the acidity of the chromium reagent. Acidic reagents such as PCC may cause ionization and recombination of the chromate ester (path A), while the basic reagents (Collins) likely undergo direct allylic transposition via sigmatropic rearrangement (path B).

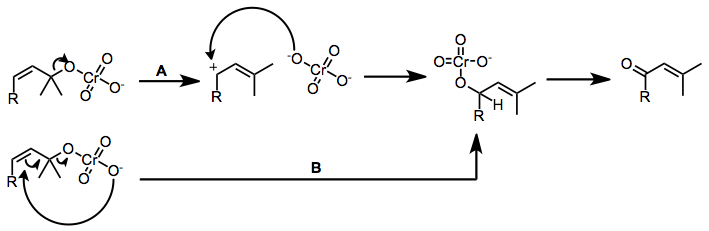

Oxidative cyclizations of olefinic alcohols to cyclic ethers may occur via [3+2], [2+2], or epoxidation mechanisms. Insights into the mechanism is provided by structure-reactivity, implicating direct epoxidation by the chromate ester. Subsequent epoxide opening and release of chromium leads to the observed products.

== Scope and limitations ==
Buffering agents may be used to prevent acid-labile protecting groups from being removed during chromium(VI)-amine oxidations. However, buffers will also slow down oxidative cyclizations, leading to selective oxidation of alcohols over any other sort of oxidative transformation. Citronellol, for instance, which cyclizes to isopulegol in the presence of PCC, does not undergo cyclization when buffers are used.

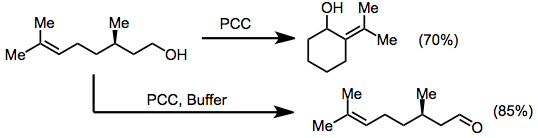

Oxidative cyclization can be used to prepare substituted tetrahydrofurans. Cyclization of dienols leads to the formation of two tetrahydrofuran rings in a syn fashion.

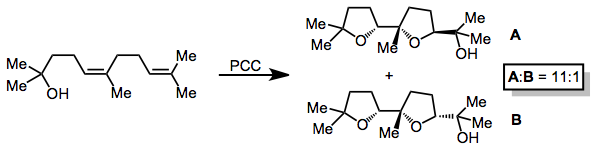

Enones can be synthesized from tertiary allylic alcohols through the action of a variety of chromium(VI)-amine reagents, in a reaction known as the Babler oxidation. The reaction is driven by the formation of a more substituted double bond. (E)-Enones form in greater amounts than (Z) isomers because of chromium-mediated geometric isomerization.

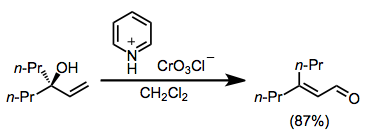

Suitably substituted olefinic alcohols undergo oxidative cyclization to give tetrahydrofurans. Further oxidation of these compounds to give tetrahydropyranyl carbonyl compounds then occurs.

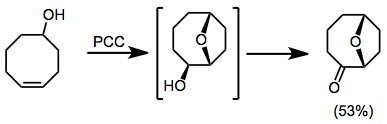

In addition to the limitations described above, chromium(VI) reagents are often unsuccessful in the oxidation of substrates containing heteroatoms (particularly nitrogen). Coordination of the heteroatoms to chromium (with displacements of the amine ligand originally attached to the metal) leads to deactivation and eventual decomposition of the oxidizing agent.

== Comparison with other methods ==
Methods employing dimethyl sulfoxide (the Swern and Moffatt oxidations) are superior to chromium(VI)-amines for oxidations of substrates with heteroatom functionality that may coordinate to chromium. Dess-Martin periodinane (DMP) offers the advantages of operational simplicity, a lack of heavy metal byproducts, and selective oxidation of complex, late-stage synthetic intermediates. Additionally, both DMP and manganese dioxide (MnO_{2}) can be used to oxidize allylic alcohols to the corresponding enones without allylic transposition. When allylic transpositions is desired, however, chromium(VI)-amine reagents are unrivaled.

Catalytic methods employing cheap, clean terminal oxidants in conjunction with catalytic amounts of chromium reagents produce only small amounts of metal byproducts. However, undesired side reactions mediated by stoichiometric amounts of the terminal oxidant may occur.

== Historic references ==
- Poos, G. I.; Arth, G. E.; Beyler, R. E.; Sarrett, L. H. J. Am. Chem. Soc., 1953, 75, 422.
- Ronald Ratcliffe and Ronald Rodehorst (1970). "Improved Procedure for Oxidations with the Chromium Trioxide-Pyridine Complex". J. Org. Chem. 35 (11): 4000–4001. doi:10.1021/jo00836a108.
