= Chromic acid =

Mixture of concentrated sulfuric acid and dichromate

Chromic acid Dichromic acid
- Structural formulae of dichromic acid (left) and chromic acid (right) Dichromic acid (left) and chromic acid (right)

Names
- IUPAC names Chromic acid Dichromic acid
- Systematic IUPAC name Dihydroxidodioxidochromium
- Other names Chromic(VI) acid Tetraoxochromic acid

Identifiers
CAS Number	7738-94-5
3D model (JSmol)	Interactive image; Interactive image
ChEBI	CHEBI:33143
ChemSpider	22834
ECHA InfoCard	100.028.910
EC Number	231-801-5
Gmelin Reference	25982
PubChem CID	24425
UNII	SA8VOV0V7Q
UN number	1755 1463
CompTox Dashboard (EPA)	DTXSID8034455
- InChI: InChI=1S/Cr.2H2O.2O/h;2*1H2;;/q+2;;;;/p-2 Key: KRVSOGSZCMJSLX-UHFFFAOYSA-L; InChI=1/Cr.2H2O.2O/h;2*1H2;;/q+2;;;;/p-2/rCrH2O4/c2-1(3,4)5/h2-3H Key: KRVSOGSZCMJSLX-OOUCQFSRAZ
- SMILES: O[Cr](O)(=O)=O; O=[Cr](=O)(O)O

Properties
Chemical formula	H_{2}CrO_{4} (chromic acid); H_{2}Cr_{2}O_{7} (dichromic acid)
Molar mass	118.008 g/mol (chromic acid); 218.001 g/mol (dichromic acid)
Appearance	Dark purplish-red sand-like crystalline solid or powder
Odor	Odorless
Density	1.201 g/cm^{3}
Melting point	197 °C (387 °F; 470 K)
Boiling point	250 °C (482 °F; 523 K) (decomposes)
Solubility in water	169 g/(100 mL)
Acidity (pK_{a})	−0.8 to 1.6 (chromic acid)
Conjugate base	Chromate and dichromate

Hazards
- Occupational safety and health (OHS/OSH)
Main hazards	highly toxic, carcinogen, corrosive
- GHS labelling
Pictograms	(GHS03: Oxidizing) (GHS05: Corrosive) (GHS06: Toxic) (GHS07: Exclamation mark) (GHS08: Health hazard) (GHS09: Environmental hazard)
Signal word	Danger
Hazard statements	H271, H300+H310+H330, H301, H314, H317, H334, H340, H341, H350, H361, H372, H410
Precautionary statements	P201, P202, P210, P220, P221, P260, P262, P264, P270, P271, P272, P273, P280, P281, P283, P284, P285, P301+P310, P301+P330+P331, P302+P350, P302+P352, P303+P361+P353, P304+P340, P304+P341, P305+P351+P338, P306+P360, P308+P313, P310, P314, P320, P321, P330, P333+P313, P342+P311, P361, P363, P370+P378, P371+P380+P375, P391, P403+P233, P405, P501
NFPA 704 (fire diamond)	4 0 1 COR
- Lethal dose or concentration (LD, LC)
LD_{50} (median dose)	51.9 mg/kg (H_{2}CrO_{4}·2Na, rat, oral)
- NIOSH (US health exposure limits)
PEL (Permissible)	TWA 0.005 mg/m^{3}
REL (Recommended)	TWA 0.001 mg Cr(VI)/m^{3}
IDLH (Immediate danger)	15 mg Cr(VI)/m^{3}
- Except where otherwise noted, data are given for materials in their standard state (at 25 °C [77 °F], 100 kPa). verify (what is ?) Infobox references

Chromic acid is a chemical compound with the chemical formula H_{2}CrO_{4}. More generally, it is the name for a solution formed by the addition of sulfuric acid to aqueous solutions of dichromate. It consists at least in part of chromium trioxide.

The term "chromic acid" is usually used for a mixture made by adding concentrated sulfuric acid to a dichromate, which may contain a variety of compounds, including solid chromium trioxide. This kind of chromic acid may be used as a cleaning mixture for glass. Chromic acid may also refer to the molecular species, H_{2}CrO_{4} of which the trioxide is the anhydride. Chromic acid features chromium in an oxidation state of +6 (and a valence of VI or 6). It is a strong and corrosive oxidizing agent and a moderate carcinogen.

== Molecular chromic acid ==
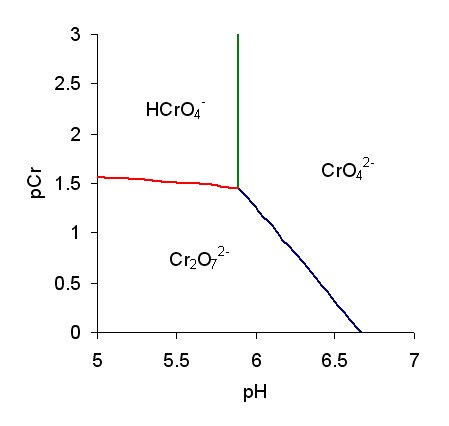
Partial predominance diagram for chromate

Molecular chromic acid, H_{2}CrO_{4}, in principle, resembles sulfuric acid, H_{2}SO_{4}. It would ionize accordingly:

H_{2}CrO_{4} ⇌ [HCrO_{4}]^{−} + H^{+}

The pK_{a} for the equilibrium is not well characterized. Reported values vary between about −0.8 to 1.6. The structure of the mono anion has been determined by X-ray crystallography. In this tetrahedral oxyanion, three Cr-O bond lengths are 156 pm and the Cr-OH bond is 201 pm

[HCrO_{4}]^{−} condenses to form dichromate:

2 [HCrO_{4}]^{−} ⇌ [Cr_{2}O_{7}]^{2−} + H_{2}O, logK_{D} = 2.05.

Furthermore, the dichromate can be protonated:

[HCr_{2}O_{7}]^{−} ⇌ [Cr_{2}O_{7}]^{2−} + H^{+}, pK_{a} = 1.8

Loss of the second proton occurs in the pH range 4–8, making the ion [HCrO_{4}]^{−} a weak acid.

Molecular chromic acid could in principle be made by adding chromium trioxide to water (cf. manufacture of sulfuric acid).

CrO_{3} + H_{2}O ⇌ H_{2}CrO_{4}

In practice, the reverse reaction occurs: molecular chromic acid dehydrates. Some insights can be gleaned from observations on the reaction of dichromate solutions with sulfuric acid. The first colour change from orange to red signals the conversion of dichromate to chromic acid. Under these conditions deep red crystals of chromium trioxide precipitate from the mixture, without further colour change.

Chromium trioxide is the anhydride of molecular chromic acid. It is a Lewis acid and can react with a Lewis base, such as pyridine in a non-aqueous medium such as dichloromethane (Collins reagent).

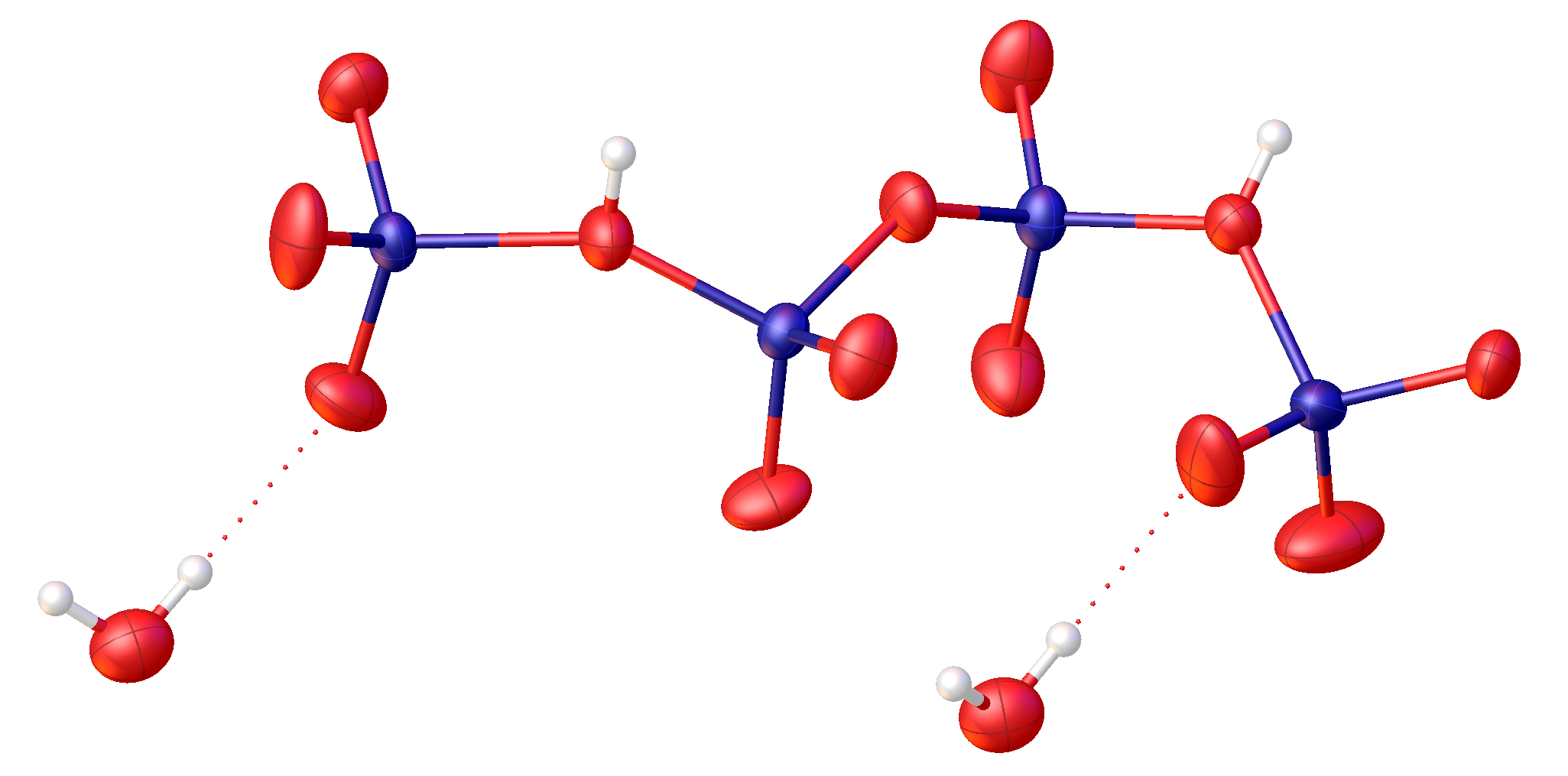
Structure of tetrachromic acid H_{2}Cr_{4}O_{13}·2H_{2}O, one component of concentrated "chromic acid". The H-atom positions are calculated, not observed. Color code: red = O, white = H, blue = Cr.

Higher chromic acids with the formula H_{2}Cr_{n}O_{(3n+1)} are probable components of concentrated solutions of chromic acid.

== Uses ==
Chromic acid is an intermediate in chromium plating, and is also used in ceramic glazes, and colored glass. Because a solution of chromic acid in sulfuric acid (also known as a sulfochromic mixture or chromosulfuric acid) is a powerful oxidizing agent, it can be used to clean laboratory glassware, particularly of otherwise insoluble organic residues. This application has declined due to environmental concerns. Furthermore, the acid leaves trace amounts of paramagnetic chromic ions (Cr^{3+}) that can interfere with certain applications, such as NMR spectroscopy. This is especially the case for NMR tubes. Piranha solution can be used for the same task, without leaving metallic residues behind.

Chromic acid was widely used in the musical instrument repair industry, due to its ability to "brighten" raw brass. A chromic acid dip leaves behind a bright yellow patina on the brass. Due to growing health and environmental concerns, many have discontinued use of this chemical in their repair shops.

It was used in hair dye in the 1940s, under the name Melereon.

It is used as a bleach in processing black and white photographic reversal film.

== Reactions ==
Chromic acid is capable of oxidizing many kinds of organic compounds and many variations on this reagent have been developed:

- Chromic acid in aqueous sulfuric acid and acetone is known as the Jones reagent, which will oxidize primary and secondary alcohols to carboxylic acids and ketones respectively, while rarely affecting unsaturated bonds.
- Pyridinium chlorochromate is generated from chromium trioxide and pyridinium chloride. This reagent converts primary alcohols to the corresponding aldehydes (R–CHO).
- Collins reagent is an adduct of chromium trioxide and pyridine used for diverse oxidations.
- Chromyl chloride, CrO_{2}Cl_{2} is a well-defined molecular compound that is generated from chromic acid.

=== Illustrative transformations ===
- Oxidation of methylbenzenes to benzoic acids.
- Oxidative scission of indene to homophthalic acid.
- Oxidation of secondary alcohol to ketone (cyclooctanone) and nortricyclanone.

=== Use in qualitative organic analysis ===
In organic chemistry, dilute solutions of chromic acid can be used to oxidize primary or secondary alcohols to the corresponding aldehydes and ketones. Similarly, it can also be used to oxidize an aldehyde to its corresponding carboxylic acid. Tertiary alcohols and ketones are unaffected. However, in acidic conditions, some tertiary alcohols may isomerize to an oxidizable alcohol, though such an isomerization is usually not of concern. Because the oxidation is signaled by a color change from orange to brownish green (indicating chromium being reduced from oxidation state +6 to +3), chromic acid is commonly used as a lab reagent in high school or undergraduate college chemistry as a qualitative analytical test for the presence of primary or secondary alcohols, or aldehydes.

=== Alternative reagents ===
In oxidations of alcohols or aldehydes into carboxylic acids, chromic acid is one of several reagents, including several that are catalytic. For example, nickel(II) salts catalyze oxidations by bleach (hypochlorite). Aldehydes are relatively easily oxidized to carboxylic acids, and mild oxidizing agents are sufficient. Silver(I) compounds have been used for this purpose. Each oxidant offers advantages and disadvantages. Instead of using chemical oxidants, electrochemical oxidation is often possible.

== Safety ==
Hexavalent chromium compounds (including chromium trioxide, chromic acids, chromates, chlorochromates) are toxic and carcinogenic. Chromium trioxide and chromic acids are strong oxidizers and may react violently if mixed with easily oxidizable organic substances.

Chromic acid burns are treated with a dilute sodium thiosulfate solution.
