= Chromate ester =

Class of chemical compounds

Structure of a chromate ester.

A chromate ester is a chemical species that contains a chromium atom (symbol Cr) in a +6 oxidation state that is bonded to a oxide (O^{2-}) and an alkoxide (OR-). Such compounds are common intermediates in oxidation of organic compounds by chromates and related compounds.

== Synthesis ==
Chromate esters, which are mainly of academic interest, are few and often labile. They can be isolated with bulky organic substituents such as tert-butyl or triphenylmethyl. Key is the absence of an alpha C-H bond. Suitable sources of chromium are chromium trioxide (CrO_{3}), chromyl chloride (CrO_{2}Cl_{2}), and similar Cr(VI) reagents. For example, the treatment of chromium trioxide with trityl chloride gives two chromate esters:

CrO_{3} + Ph_{3}CCl → CrClO_{2}(OCPh_{3}) (Ph = C_{6}H_{5})
2 CrClO_{2}(OCPh_{3}) → CrO_{2}(OCPh_{3})_{2} + CrCl_{2}O_{2}

=== Diesters ===
Usually chromate ester refers to monoesters, which are transient intermediates in the oxidation of alcohols by chromium(VI) oxides. Dialkychromates have the formula CrO_{2}(OR)_{2}. When R lacks an alpha hydrogen, these diesters are isolable. One chromate diester has attracted significant attention: ((CH_{3})_{3}CO)_{2}CrO_{2}. It is not an intermediate, rather a reagent. For example, it converts cyclohexene to 2-cyclohexenone.

== Mechanistic significance ==
Chromate esters tend to react via redox reactions to liberate chromium(IV). This conversion is rapid when an alpha C-H bond is present (primary and secondary alcohols). Idealized equations for the oxidation of an alcohol are:

formation of the chromate esterr: [CrO_{4}]^{2−} + HOCHR_{2} → CrO_{3}(OCHR_{2})^{−} + OH^{−}
fragmentation of the chromate ester: CrO_{3}(OCHR_{2})^{−} → CrO_{2} + R_{2}C=O + OH^{−}

In this way, chromate esters are reactive intermediates in the Jones oxidation, the mechanistically related oxidations using pyridinium dichromate and pyridinium chlorochromate. Chromate esters of allyl alcohols may isomerize via formal [3,3]-sigmatropic shift to give rearranged enone products.
