= Alcohol oxidation =

Chemical reaction

Alcohol oxidation is a collection of oxidation reactions in organic chemistry that convert alcohols to aldehydes, ketones, carboxylic acids, and esters. The reaction mainly applies to primary and secondary alcohols. Secondary alcohols form ketones, while primary alcohols form aldehydes or carboxylic acids. A variety of oxidants can be used.

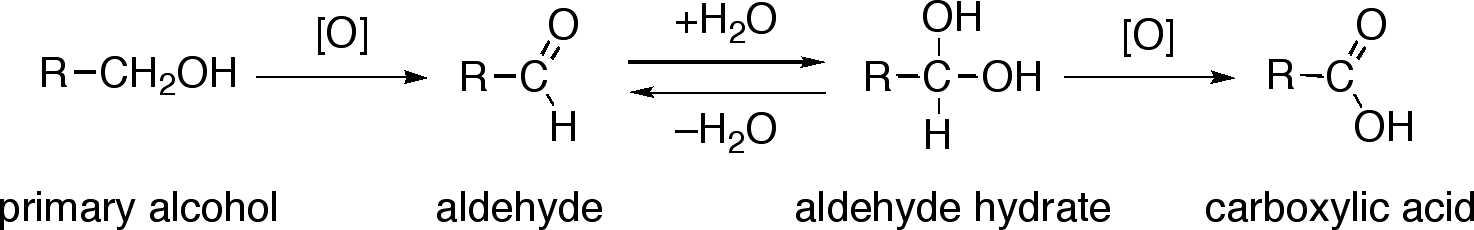
Stages in the oxidation of primary alcohols to carboxylic acids via aldehydes and aldehyde hydrates

Almost all industrial scale oxidations use oxygen or air as the oxidant.

Through a variety of mechanisms, the removal of a hydride equivalent converts a primary or secondary alcohol to an aldehyde or ketone, respectively. The oxidation of primary alcohols to carboxylic acids normally proceeds via the corresponding aldehyde, which is transformed via an aldehyde hydrate (gem-diol, R-CH(OH)_{2}) by reaction with water. Thus, the oxidation of a primary alcohol at the aldehyde level without further oxidation to the carboxylic acid is possible by performing the reaction in absence of water, so that no aldehyde hydrate can be formed.

Oxidation of alcohols to aldehydes and ketones

== To aldehydes and ketones ==
=== In industry ===
The largest operations involve the oxidation of methanol and ethanol to formaldehyde and acetaldehyde, which are produced on million ton scale annually. Both processes use O_{2} as the oxidant. Methanol oxidation employs a molybdenum oxide-based catalyst. Other large scale aldehydes and ketones are produced by autoxidation of hydrocarbons: benzaldehyde from toluene, acrolein from propylene, acetone from cumene, cyclohexanone from cyclohexanol.

=== Laboratory ===
In teaching laboratories and small scale operations, many reagents have been developed for the oxidation of secondary alcohols to ketones and primary alcohols to aldehydes. Allylic and benzylic alcohols are especially prone to oxidation. Aldehydes are susceptible to over oxidation to carboxylic acids.

==== Chromium(VI) reagents ====

Chromium(VI) reagents are commonly used for these oxidations. One family of Cr(VI) reagents employs the complex CrO_{3}(pyridine)_{2}.

- Sarett's reagent: a solution of CrO_{3}(pyridine)_{2} in pyridine. It was popularized for selective oxidation of primary and secondary alcohols to carbonyl compounds.
- Collins reagent is a solution of the same CrO_{3}(pyridine)_{2} but in dichloromethane. The Ratcliffe variant of Collins reagent relates to details of the preparation of this solution, i.e., the addition of chromium trioxide to a solution of pyridine in methylene chloride.

A second family of Cr(VI) reagents are salts, featuring the pyridinium cation (C_{5}H_{5}NH^{+}).

- pyridinium dichromate (PDC) is the pyridium salt of dichromate, [Cr_{2}O_{7}]^{2-}.
- pyridinium chlorochromate (PCC) is the pyridinium salt of [CrO_{3}Cl]^{−}.

These salts are less reactive, more easily handled, and more selective than Collins reagent in oxidations of alcohols.

The above reagents represent improvements over the older Jones reagent, a solution of chromium trioxide in aqueous sulfuric acid.

==== Dess–Martin and related oxidations ====
The Dess–Martin periodinane is a mild oxidant for the conversion of alcohols to aldehydes or ketones. The reaction is performed under standard conditions, at room temperature, most often in dichloromethane. The reaction takes between half an hour and two hours to complete. The product is then separated from the spent periodinane. Many iodosyl-based oxidants have been developed, e.g. IBX.

==== Swern oxidation ====
Swern oxidation uses oxalyl chloride, dimethylsulfoxide, and an organic base, such as triethylamine.

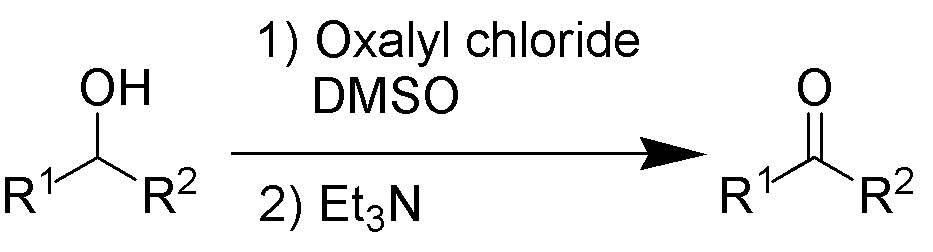

The by-products are dimethyl sulfide (Me_{2}S), carbon monoxide (CO), carbon dioxide (CO_{2}) and – when triethylamine is used as base – triethylammonium chloride (C_{6}H_{15}NHCl).

The related N-tert-Butylbenzenesulfinimidoyl chloride combines both the sulfur(IV), the base, and the activating Lewis acid in one molecule.

==== Oppenauer oxidation ====

This seldom-used method interconverts alcohols and carbonyls.

==== Niche methods ====
Ley oxidation uses NMO as the stoichiometric oxidant with tetrapropylammonium perruthenate as a catalyst.

Fétizon oxidation, also a seldom-used method, uses silver carbonate supported on Celite. This reagent operates through single electron oxidation by the silver cations.

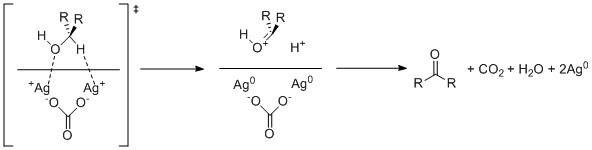

Another method is the oxoammonium-catalyzed oxidation. TEMPO exhibits a strong, pH-dependent selectivity for either primary or secondary alcohols; but the effect is primarily steric and other N-oxides behave differently.

Additionally, sodium hypochlorite (or household bleach) in acetic acid has been reported for efficient conversion of secondary alcohols in the presence of primary alcohols (Stevens oxidation).

Soluble transition metal complexes catalyze the oxidation of alcohols by presence of dioxygen or another terminal oxidant.

== Oxidation of diols ==
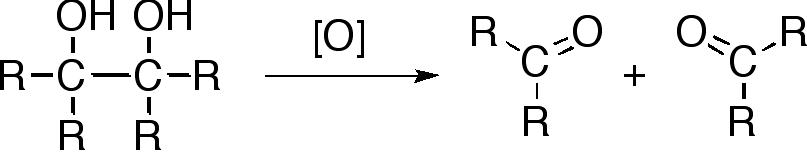
Oxidative cleavage of carbon-carbon bond in 1,2-diols

The largest scale oxidation of 1,2-diols gives glyoxal from ethylene glycol. The conversion uses air or sometimes nitric acid.

In the laboratory, vicinal diols suffer oxidative breakage at a carbon-carbon bond with some oxidants such as sodium periodate (NaIO_{4}), (diacetoxyiodo)benzene (PhI(OAc)_{2}) or lead tetraacetate (Pb(OAc)_{4}), resulting in generation of two carbonyl groups. The reaction is also known as glycol cleavage.

== To carboxylic acids ==
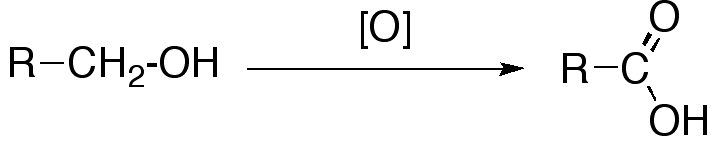

=== In industry ===
The oxidation of primary alcohols to carboxylic acids can be carried out using a variety of reagents, but O_{2}/air and nitric acid dominate as the oxidants on a commercial scale. Large scale oxidations of this type are used for the conversion of cyclohexanol alone or as a mixture with cyclohexanone to adipic acid. Similarly cyclododecanol is converted to the 12-carbon dicarboxylic acid. 3,5,5-Trimethylcyclohexanol is similarly oxidized to trimethyladipic acid.

Many specialty reagents have been developed for laboratory scale oxidations of alcohols to carboxylic acids.

=== Potassium permanganate ===
Potassium permanganate (KMnO_{4}) oxidizes primary alcohols to carboxylic acids very efficiently. This reaction, which was first described in detail by Fournier, is typically carried out by adding KMnO_{4} to a solution or suspension of the alcohol in an alkaline aqueous solution. For the reaction to proceed efficiently, the alcohol must be at least partially dissolved in the aqueous solution. This can be facilitated by the addition of an organic co-solvent such as dioxane, pyridine, acetone or t-BuOH. KMnO_{4} reacts with many functional groups, such as secondary alcohols, 1,2-diols, aldehydes, alkenes, oximes, sulfides and thiols, and carbon-carbon double bonds. Thus, selectivity is an issue.

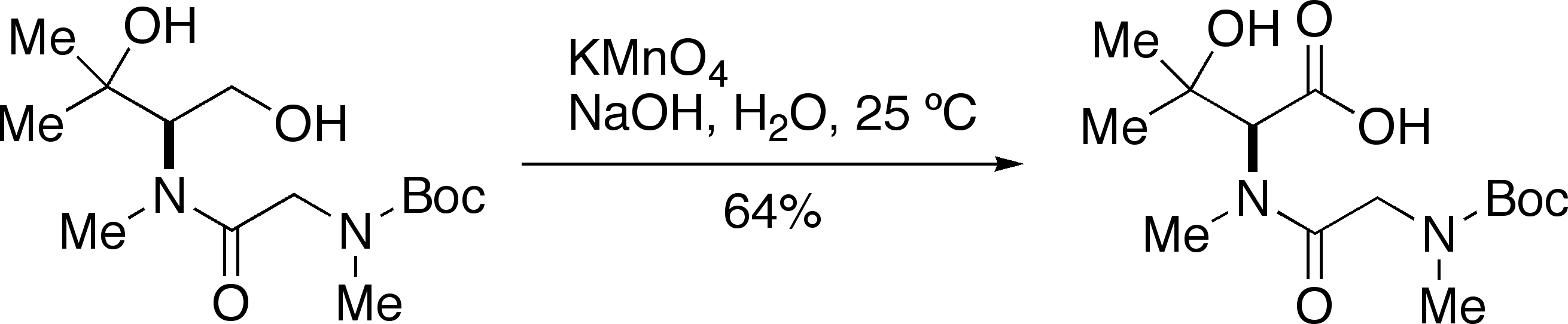
Ciufolini and Swaminathan oxidized a primary alcohol to carboxylic acid with KMnO_{4} in aqueous NaOH during the obtention of a rare amino acid derivative needed for the preparation of antibiotics isolated from Actinomadura luzonensis, a microorganism found in a soil sample collected in Luzon island in the Philippines

=== Jones oxidation ===
The so-called Jones reagent, prepared from chromium trioxide (CrO_{3}) and aqueous sulfuric acid, oxidizes alcohols to a carboxylic acid. The protocol frequently affords substantial amounts of esters. Problems are the toxicity and environmental unfriendliness of the reagent. Catalytic variant, involving treatment with excess of periodic acid (H_{5}IO_{6}) have been described.

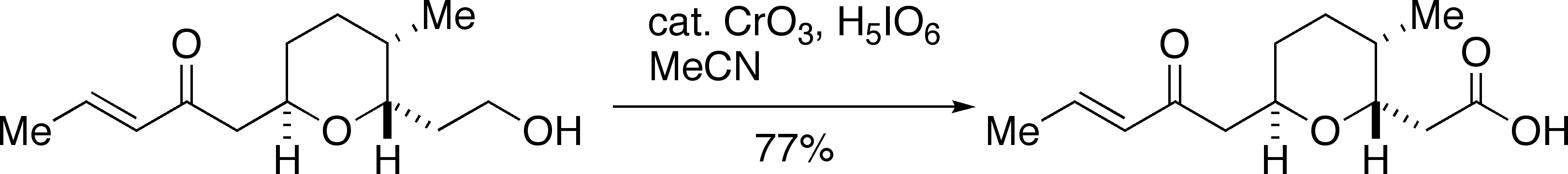
Crimmins and DeBaillie

=== Two-step oxidation of alcohols to acids via isolated aldehydes ===
As a lot of the aforementioned conditions for the oxidations of primary alcohols to acids are harsh and not compatible with common protection groups, organic chemists often use a two-step procedure for the oxidation to acids. The alcohol is oxidized to an aldehyde using one of the many procedures above. This sequence is often used in natural product synthesis as in their synthesis of platencin.

=== Niche methods and reagents ===
Ruthenium tetroxide is an aggressive, seldom-used agent that allows mild reaction conditions.

Heyns oxidation.

The use of chlorites as terminal oxidants in conjunction with both hypochlorites and TEMPO gives carboxylic acids without chlorination side products. The reaction is usually carried out in two steps in the same pot: partial oxidation is effected with TEMPO and hypochlorite, then chlorite is added to complete the oxidation. Only primary alcohol oxidation is observed. In conjunction with Sharpless dihydroxylation, this method can be used to generate enantiopure α-hydroxy acids.

The Pinnick oxidation uses sodium chlorite.
