= Sarett oxidation =

Organic reaction

Named after	Lewis Hastings Sarett
Reaction type	Organic redox reaction

Identifiers
RSC ontology ID	RXNO:0000547

The Sarett oxidation is an organic reaction that oxidizes primary and secondary alcohols to aldehydes and ketones, respectively, using chromium trioxide and pyridine. Unlike the similar Jones oxidation, the Sarett oxidation will not further oxidize primary alcohols to their carboxylic acid form, neither will it affect carbon-carbon double bonds. Use of the original Sarett oxidation has become largely antiquated however, in favor of other modified oxidation techniques. The unadulterated reaction is still occasionally used in teaching settings and in small scale laboratory research.

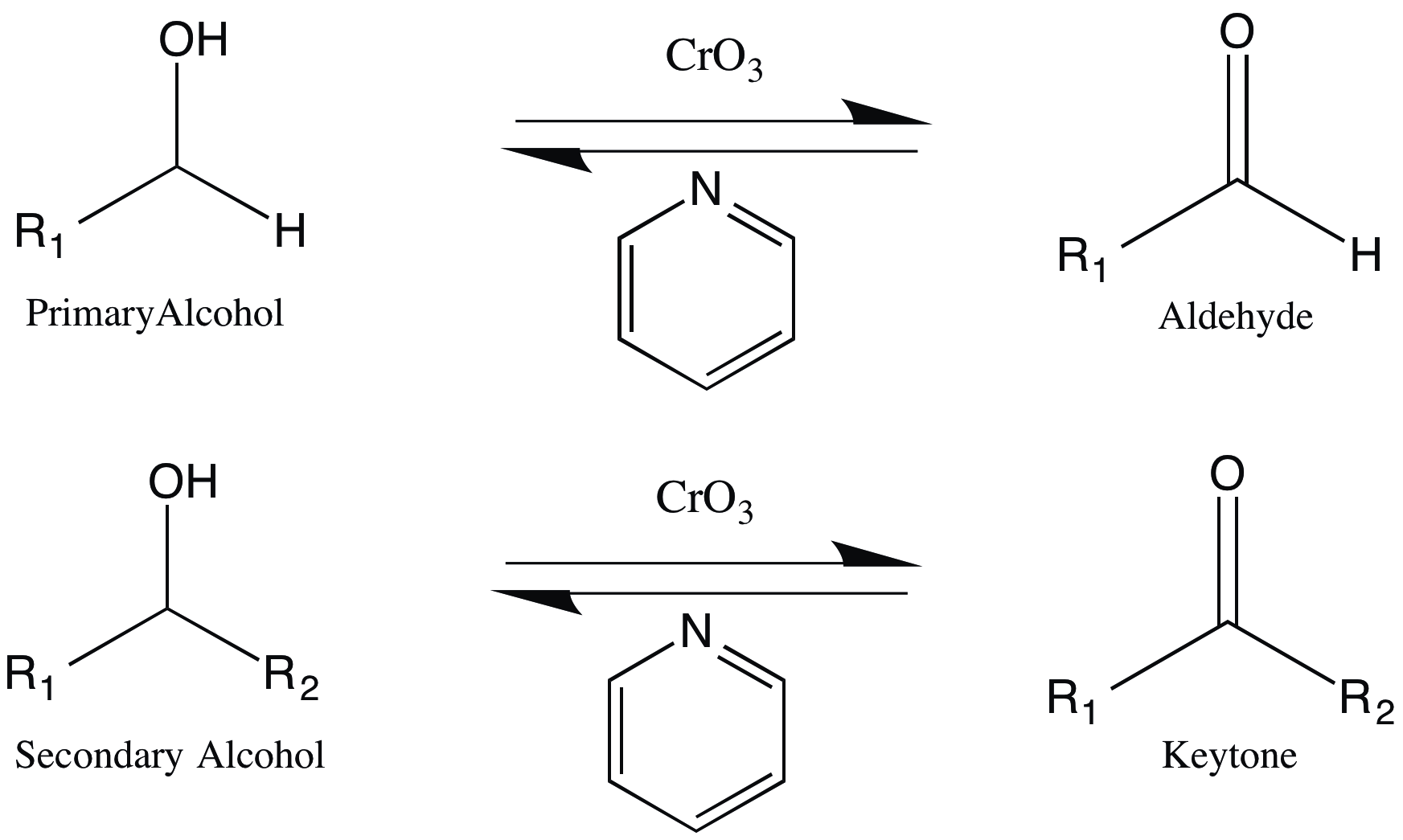
Schematic showing the oxidation of generic primary, and secondary alcohols into the respective aldehydes and ketones via the Sarett oxidation.

== History ==
=== First appearance ===
Molecular structure of the Sarett/Collins reagent

The reaction is named after the American chemist Lewis Hastings Sarett (1917–1999). The first description of its use appears in a 1953 article co-authored by Sarett that relates to the synthesis of adrenal steroids. The paper proposes the use of the pyridine chromium complex CrO_{3}-2C_{5}H_{5}N to oxidize primary and secondary alcohols. The complex would later become known as the "Sarett Reagent".

=== Modifications and improvements ===
Although the Sarett reagent gives good yields of ketones, its conversion of primary alcohols is less efficient. Furthermore, the isolation of products from the reaction solution can be difficult. These limitations were partially addressed with the introduction of the Collins oxidation. The active ingredient in both the Sarett reagent is identical to that in the so-called "Collins reagent", i.e. the pyridine complex (CrO_{3}(C_{5}H_{5}N)_{2}. The Collins oxidation varies from the Sarett oxidation only in that it uses methylene chloride as solvent instead of neat pyridine. The initially proposed methods of executing the Collins and Sarett oxidations were still not ideal however, as the Sarett reagent's hygroscopic, and pyrophoric properties make it difficult to prepare. This issues lead to an improvement of the Collins oxidation protocol known as the Ratcliffe variant.

== Preparation of the Sarett reagent ==
=== Techniques ===
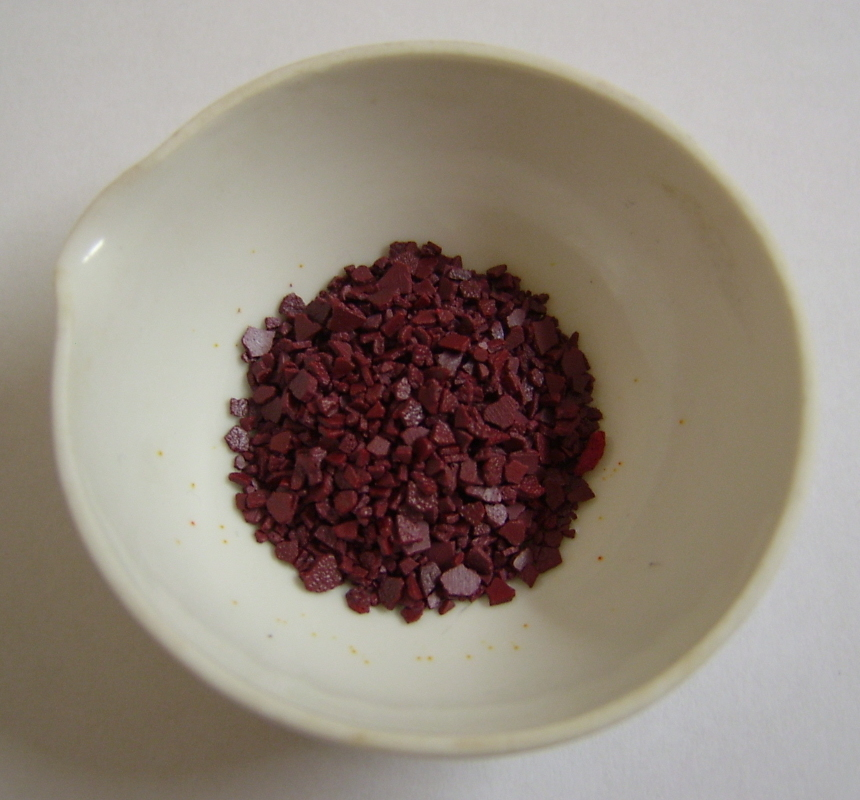
The brick-red color of unreacted chromium trioxide (chromic anhydride).

The Sarett reagent was originally prepared in 1953 by addition of chromium trioxide to pyridine. The pyridine must be cooled because the reaction is dangerously exothermic. Slowly, the brick-red CrO_{3} transform into the bis(pyridine) adduct. Subsequent to the conversion to the Sarett reagent, it is immediately used.

=== Safety ===
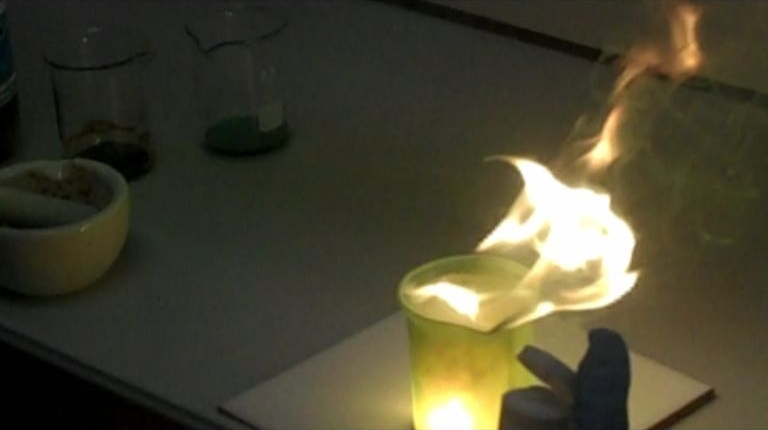
Improper handling of chromium trioxide can result in fire.

The specific methods of the reagent's preparation are critical, as improper technique can cause the explosion of the materials. Some technical improvements to the original methodology have reduced the risks associated with preparation. One such recent improvement reduced the likelihood of explosion by using chromic anhydride granules that would immediately sink below the surface of the cooled pyridine upon addition. It should also be mentioned that chromium trioxide is a corrosive carcinogen and therefore must be handled with extreme care.

=== Collins technique ===
The original Collins oxidation calls for the Sarett reagent to be removed from the excess pyridine and dissolved in the less basic methylene chloride. While the new solvent improves the overall yield of the reaction, it also requires the dangerous transfer of the pyrophoric reagent. The 1970 Ratcliffe variation reduced the risk of explosion by calling for the Sarett reagent to be made in situ. This was achieved by creating the Sarett reagent according to the original protocol using a stirred mixture of pyridine and methylene chloride.

== Specific applications ==
The Sarett oxidation efficiently oxidizes primary alcohols to aldehydes without further oxidizing them to carboxylic acids. This key difference from the Jones oxidation is that the Jones oxidation occurs in the presence of water, which adds to the alcohol following oxidation to an aldehyde. The Sarett and Collins oxidations occur in the absence of water. The Sarett oxidation also proceeds under basic conditions, which allows for the use of acid sensitive substrates, such as those containing certain protecting groups. This is dissimilar to other common acidic oxidation reactions such as the Baeyer-Villiger oxidation, which would remove or alter such groups. Additionally, the Sarett reagent is relatively inert towards double bonds and thioether groups. These groups cannot effectively interact with the chromium of the Sarett reagent, as compared to the chromium in oxidizing complexes used prior to 1953.

== See also ==
- Pyridinium chlorochromate
- Jones oxidation
