= Dichlorotetrakis(pyridine)iron(II) =

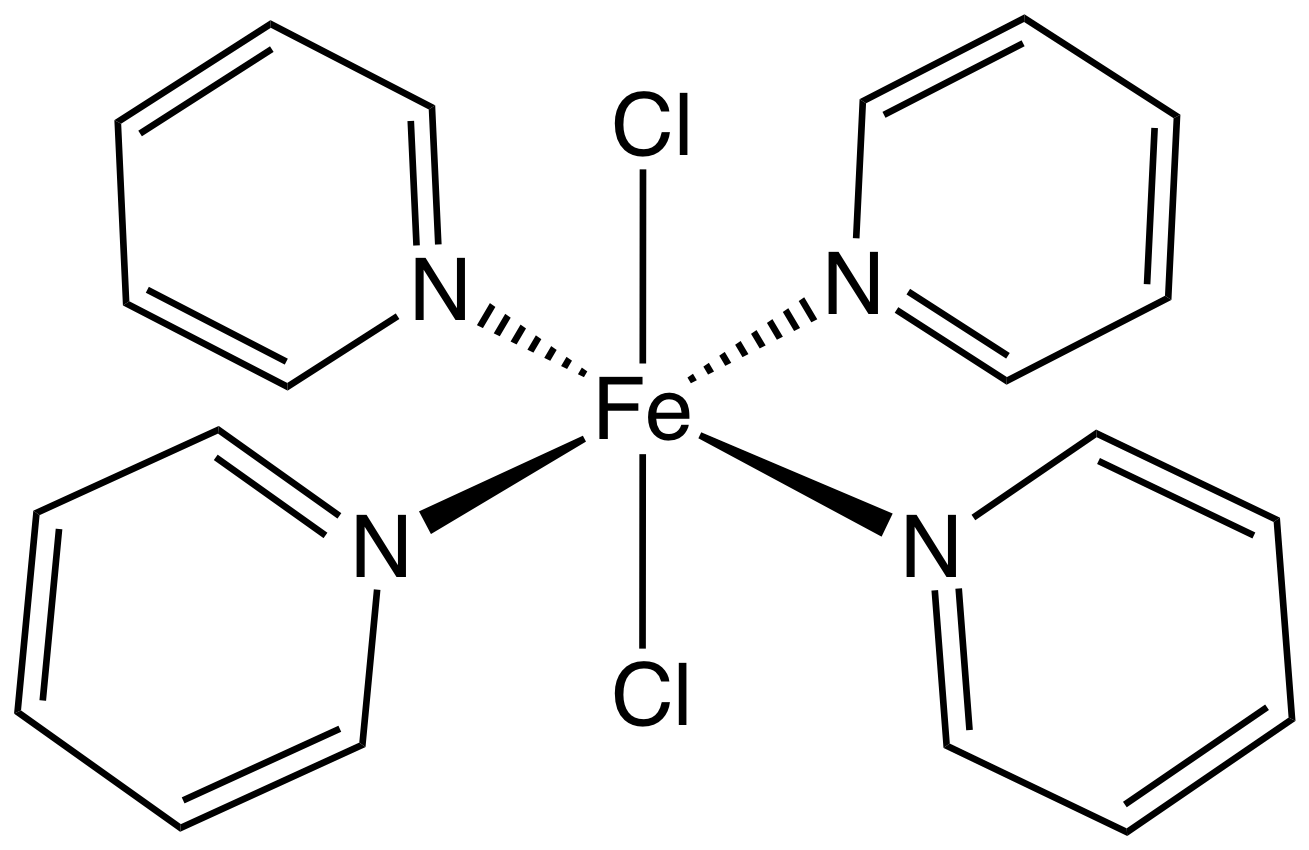

Names
- IUPAC name Dichlorotetrakis(pyridine)iron(II)
- Other names Tetrakis(pyridine)iron(II) dichloride

Identifiers
CAS Number	15138-92-8 monohydrate
3D model (JSmol)	Interactive image
ChemSpider	21169983
PubChem CID	15809771
- InChI: InChI=1S/4C5H5N.2ClH.Fe/c4*1-2-4-6-5-3-1;;;/h4*1-5H;2*1H;/q;;;;;;+2/p-2 Key: KVQSAWIBLUAVAB-UHFFFAOYSA-L
- SMILES: C1=CC=NC=C1.C1=CC=NC=C1.C1=CC=NC=C1.C1=CC=NC=C1.Cl[Fe]Cl

Properties
Chemical formula	C_{20}H_{20}Cl_{2}FeN_{4}
Molar mass	443.15 g·mol^{−1}
Appearance	yellow solid
Density	1.351 g/cm^{3}

Hazards
- GHS labelling
Pictograms	(GHS07: Exclamation mark)
Signal word	Warning
Hazard statements	H315, H319, H335
Precautionary statements	P261, P264, P271, P280, P302+P352, P304+P340, P305+P351+P338, P312, P321, P332+P313, P337+P313, P362, P403+P233, P405, P501
- Except where otherwise noted, data are given for materials in their standard state (at 25 °C [77 °F], 100 kPa). Infobox references

Dichlorotetrakis(pyridine)iron(II) is the coordination complex with the formula FeCl_{2}(pyridine)_{4}. A yellow solid, it is a prominent example of a transition metal pyridine complex. It is used as an anhydrous precursor to other iron complexes and catalysts. According to X-ray crystallography, the chloride ligands are mutually trans. The complex has a high spin configuration. A monohydrate as well as several related complexes are known, e.g. CoCl_{2}(pyridine)_{4} and NiCl_{2}(pyridine)_{4}. It is prepared by treating ferrous chloride with an excess of pyridine.
