= Jones oxidation =

Oxidation of alcohol

Named after	Ewart Jones
Reaction type	Organic redox reaction

Identifiers
Organic Chemistry Portal	jones-oxidation
RSC ontology ID	RXNO:0000356

The Jones oxidation is an organic reaction for the oxidation of primary and secondary alcohols to carboxylic acids and ketones, respectively. It uses chromium trioxide in an acetonic acidic medium. It is named after its discoverer, Sir Ewart Jones. The reaction was an early method for the oxidation of alcohols. Its use in organic chemistry has been displaced by related reagents such as the pyridine complex of chromium trioxide ("Collins reagent").

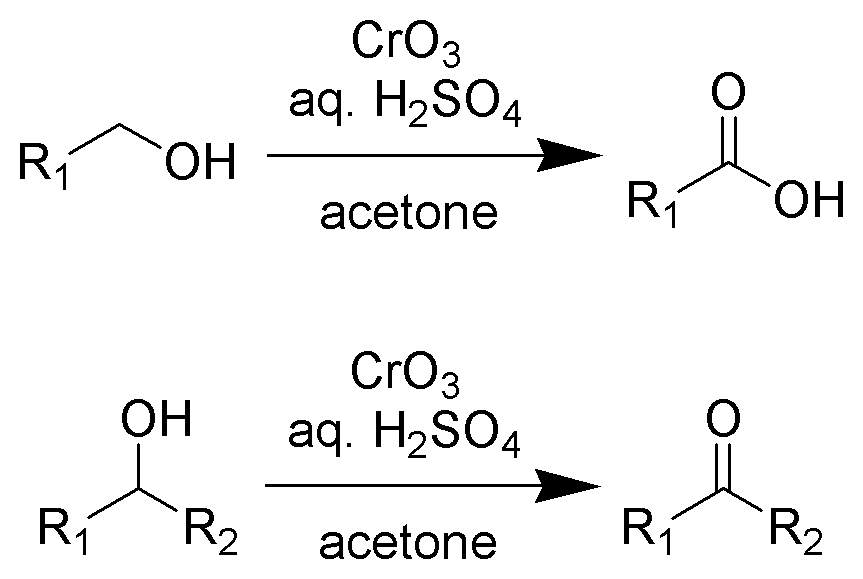
The Jones oxidation

Jones reagent is a solution prepared by dissolving chromium trioxide in aqueous sulfuric acid. To effect a Jones oxidation, this acidic mixture is then added to an acetone solution of the substrate. Alternatively, potassium dichromate can be used in place of chromium trioxide. The oxidation is very rapid and quite exothermic. Yields are typically high. The reagent is convenient and cheap. However, Cr(VI) compounds are carcinogenic, which deters the use of this methodology.

== Stoichiometry and mechanism ==
Jones reagent will convert primary and secondary alcohols to aldehydes and ketones, respectively. Depending on the reaction conditions, the aldehydes may then be converted to carboxylic acids. For oxidations to the aldehydes and ketones, two equivalents of chromic acid oxidize three equivalents of the alcohol:

2 HCrO_{4}^{−} + 3 RR'C(OH)H + 8 H^{+} + 4 H_{2}O → 2 [Cr(H_{2}O)_{6}]^{3+} + 3 RR'CO

For oxidation of primary alcohols to carboxylic acids, 4 equivalents of chromic acid oxidize 3 equivalents of the alcohol. The aldehyde is an intermediate.

4 HCrO_{4}^{−} + 3 RCH_{2}OH + 16 H^{+} + 11 H_{2}O → 4 [Cr(H_{2}O)_{6}]^{3+} + 3 RCOOH

The inorganic products are green, characteristic of chromium(III) aquo complexes.

Like many other oxidations of alcohols by metal oxides, the reaction proceeds via the formation of a mixed chromate ester: These esters have the formula CrO_{3}(OCH_{2}R)^{−}

CrO_{3}(OH)^{−} + RCH_{2}OH → CrO_{3}(OCH_{2}R)^{−} + H_{2}O

Like conventional esters, the formation of this chromate ester is accelerated by the acid. These esters can be isolated when the alcohol is tertiary because these lack the α hydrogen that would be lost to form the carbonyl. For example, using tert-butyl alcohol, one can isolate tert-butyl chromate ((CH_{3})_{3}CO)_{2}CrO_{2}), which is itself a good oxidant.

For those structures with hydrogen alpha to the oxygen, the chromate esters degrade, releasing the carbonyl product and an ill-defined Cr(IV) product:

CrO_{3}(OCH_{2}R)^{−} → CrO_{2}OH^{−} + O=CHR

The deuterated alcohols HOCD_{2}R oxidize about six times slower than the undeuterated derivatives. This large kinetic isotope effect shows that the C–H (or C–D) bond breaks in the rate-determining step.

The reaction stoichiometry implicates the Cr(IV) species "CrO_{2}OH^{−}", which comproportionates with the chromic acid to give a Cr(V) oxide, which also functions as an oxidant for the alcohol.

The oxidation of the aldehydes is proposed to proceed via the formation of hemiacetal-like intermediates, which arise from the addition of the O_{3}CrO-H^{−} bond across the C=O bond.

The reagent rarely oxidizes unsaturated bonds. In certain cases, depending on very exact stereoelectronic factors, production of epoxides may occur.

== Illustrative reactions and applications ==
It remains useful in organic synthesis. A variety of spectroscopic techniques, including infrared spectroscopy, can be used to monitor the progress of a Jones oxidation reaction. At one time the Jones oxidation was used in breathalyzers.

== Related processes ==
The other principal alcohol oxidation processes utilize Collins reagent, Cornforth reagent, and PCC. Many of these reagents represent improvements over inorganic chromium(VI) reagents such as Jones reagent with respect to selectivity, specifically in increased favorablility of oxidizing primary alcohols to aldehydes over carboxylic acids.

== Historical references ==
- Bowden, K.; Heilbron, I. M.; Jones, E. R. H (1946). "13. Researches on acetylenic compounds. Part I. The preparation of acetylenic ketones by oxidation of acetylenic carbinols and glycols". J. Chem. Soc.: 39. doi:10.1039/jr9460000039.
- Heilbron, I.M.; Jones, E.R.H.; Sondheimer, F (1949). "129. Researches on acetylenic compounds. Part XV. The oxidation of primary acetylenic carbinols and glycols". J. Chem. Soc.: 604. doi:10.1039/jr9490000604.
- Bladon, P; Fabian, Joyce M.; Henbest, H. B.; Koch, H. P.; Wood, Geoffrey W. (1951). "532. Studies in the sterol group. Part LII. Infra-red absorption of nuclear tri- and tetra-substituted ethylenic centres". J. Chem. Soc.: 2402. doi:10.1039/jr9510002402.
- Jones, E. R. H (1953). "92. The chemistry of the triterpenes. Part XIII. The further characterisation of polyporenic acid A". J. Chem. Soc.: 457. doi:10.1039/jr9530000457.
- Jones, E. R. H (1953). "520. The chemistry of the triterpenes and related compounds. Part XVIII. Elucidation of the structure of polyporenic acid C". J. Chem. Soc.: 2548. doi:10.1039/jr9530002548.
- Jones, E. R. H (1953). "599. The chemistry of the triterpenes and related compounds. Part XIX. Further evidence concerning the structure of polyporenic acid A". J. Chem. Soc.: 3019. doi:10.1039/jr9530003019.
- C. Djerassi, R. Engle and A. Bowers (1956). "Notes – The Direct Conversion of Steroidal Δ5-3β-Alcohols to Δ5- and Δ4-3-Ketones". J. Org. Chem. 21 (12): 1547–1549. doi:10.1021/jo01118a627.
