= Cornforth reagent =

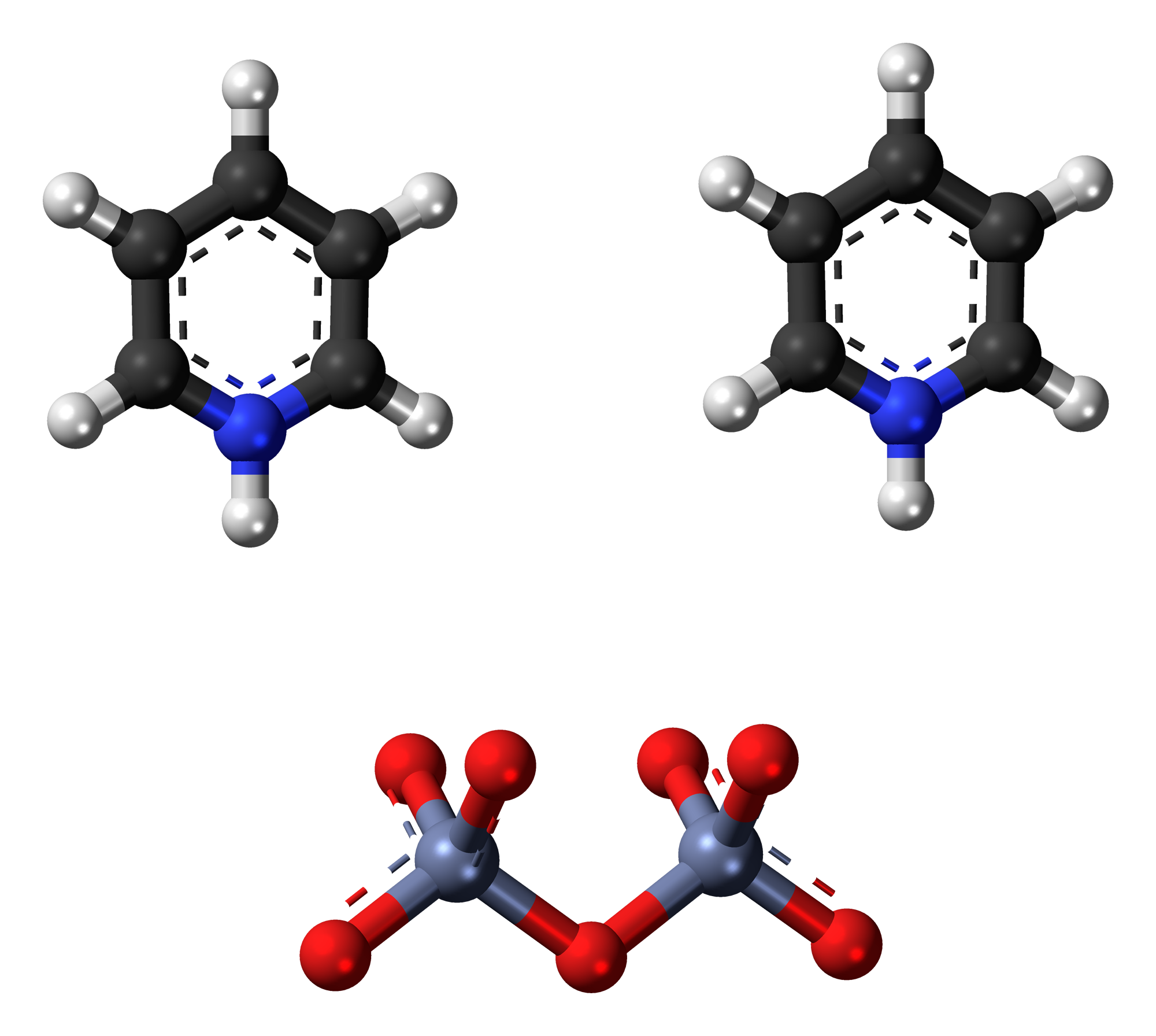

Names
- Other names Pyridinium dichromate

Identifiers
CAS Number	20039-37-6
3D model (JSmol)	Interactive image
ChEBI	CHEBI:176796
ChemSpider	2006289
ECHA InfoCard	100.039.511
EC Number	243-478-8
PubChem CID	2724130
UNII	Y7AV7UFN7K
CompTox Dashboard (EPA)	DTXSID60889393
- InChI: InChI=1S/2C5H5N.2Cr.7O/c2*1-2-4-6-5-3-1;;;;;;;;;/h2*1-5H;;;;;;;;;/q;;;;;;;;;2*-1/p+2 Key: LMYWWPCAXXPJFF-UHFFFAOYSA-P; InChI=1/2C5H5N.2Cr.7O/c2*1-2-4-6-5-3-1;;;;;;;;;/h2*1-5H;;;;;;;;;/q;;;;;;;;;2*-1/p+2/r2C5H5N.Cr2O7/c2*1-2-4-6-5-3-1;3-1(4,5)9-2(6,7)8/h2*1-5H;/q;;-2/p+2 Key: LMYWWPCAXXPJFF-OXLJHMOQAP
- SMILES: [O-][Cr](=O)(=O)O[Cr]([O-])(=O)=O.c1cc[nH+]cc1.[nH+]1ccccc1

Properties
Chemical formula	C_{10}H_{12}N_{2}Cr_{2}O_{7}
Molar mass	376.2 g/mol
Appearance	orange to brown solid
Boiling point	145 to 147 °C (293 to 297 °F; 418 to 420 K)
Solubility in water	soluble in water

Hazards
- GHS labelling
Pictograms	(GHS02: Flammable) (GHS03: Oxidizing) (GHS05: Corrosive) (GHS07: Exclamation mark) (GHS08: Health hazard) (GHS09: Environmental hazard)
Signal word	Danger
Hazard statements	H228, H272, H314, H315, H317, H319, H350, H410
Precautionary statements	P201, P202, P210, P220, P221, P240, P241, P260, P264, P272, P273, P280, P281, P301+P330+P331, P302+P352, P303+P361+P353, P304+P340, P305+P351+P338, P308+P313, P310, P321, P332+P313, P333+P313, P337+P313, P362, P363, P370+P378, P391, P405, P501
- Except where otherwise noted, data are given for materials in their standard state (at 25 °C [77 °F], 100 kPa). verify (what is ?) Infobox references

The Cornforth reagent (pyridinium dichromate or PDC) is a pyridinium salt of dichromate with the chemical formula [C_{5}H_{5}NH]_{2}[Cr_{2}O_{7}]. This compound is named after the Australian-British chemist Sir John Warcup Cornforth, who introduced it in 1962. The Cornforth reagent is a strong oxidizing agent which can convert primary and secondary alcohols to aldehydes and ketones respectively. In its chemical structure and functions it is closely related to other compounds made from hexavalent chromium oxide, such as pyridinium chlorochromate and Collins reagent. Because of their toxicity, these reagents are rarely used nowadays.

== Synthesis and properties ==
The Cornforth reagent is prepared by slow addition of a concentrated aqueous solution of chromium trioxide to pyridine. The reaction may cause explosion, which is avoided by thoroughly dissolving the trioxide in water and cooling the solution by ice. The product is filtered, washed with acetone and dried, yielding an orange powder. The powder is stable in air, not particularly hygroscopic and has an almost neutral pH that facilitates its handling; it is only slightly acidic owing to the presence of pyridinium cations. The Cornforth reagent is readily soluble in water, dimethylformamide and dimethyl sulfoxide (DMSO). It is poorly soluble in acetone and chlorinated organic solvents, such as dichloromethane, and forms suspensions.

== Applications ==
The Cornforth reagent is a strong oxidizing agent which can convert primary alcohols to aldehydes and secondary alcohols to ketones, both as a solution or suspension. This application was first mentioned in 1969, but fully developed only in 1979 by E. J. Corey and G. Schmidt. They mentioned that reaction of saturated primary alcohols with PDC, using dimethylformamide as solvent, results in oxidation to carboxylic acids rather than aldehydes. However, no oxidation to carboxylic acids occurs on allylic and benzylic primary alcohols.

The oxidation is usually carried out at ambient conditions, in nearly neutral pH conditions, in dimethylformamide or dichloromethane or their mixture. The choice of solvent or their ratio affects the reaction rate; in particular, higher content of dimethylformamide results in stronger oxidation. The slow oxidation rate for some alcohols can be accelerated by the addition of molecular sieves, organic acids or acetic anhydride or of their combinations. The acceleration by molecular sieves works best when their pore diameter is about 0.3 nm, and it is apparently unrelated to their water absorption capability. Among organic acids, acetic acid, pyridinium trifluoroacetate or pyridinium tosylate can be added, the first one being most efficient and easiest to remove. The achieved acceleration is remarkable, but the reaction inevitably turns from neutral (pH) to acidic. Comparable acceleration is achieved with acetic anhydride, which is used in sugar and nucleoside chemistry. Reaction acceleration depends not only on the additives but also on their form, so all reagents are preferred dry and freshly prepared, and PDC and molecular sieves should be finely ground. The disadvantage of the accelerators is that they may simultaneously promote several oxidation routes thereby reducing the selectivity of the reaction.

In its chemical structure and functions, the Cornforth reagent is closely related to other pyridinium salts of hexavalent chromium oxide, such as pyridinium chlorochromate [PyH][CrO_{3}Cl] and to pyridine complexes such as the Collins reagent, CrO_{3}·2Py in dichloromethane and the Sarret reagent, CrO_{3}·2Py in pyridine.

== Safety issues ==
The Cornforth reagent is very toxic to aquatic life and may cause long-term damage to the environment if released in large amounts. It irritates skin and mucous membranes and may induce allergic reactions; it is carcinogenic. The maximum allowable concentration varies between 0.01 and 0.1 mg·m^{−3} in air depending on the country. Because it contains hexavalent chromium, it is a suspected carcinogen, and as a strong oxidant, pyridinium dichromate promotes fires, releasing carbon monoxide, carbon dioxide and toxic metal smoke. The fire can be extinguished by water or CO_{2}.

== See also ==
- Oxidation with chromium(VI)-amine complexes
