= Collins reagent =

Names
- IUPAC name Pyridine - trioxochromium (2:1)
- Other names Dipyridine chromium(VI) oxide

Identifiers
CAS Number	26412-88-4
3D model (JSmol)	Interactive image
ChemSpider	79908
PubChem CID	88565
- InChI: InChI=1S/2C5H5N.Cr.3O/c2*1-2-4-6-5-3-1;;;;/h2*1-5H;;;; Key: NPRDHMWYZHSAHR-UHFFFAOYSA-N; InChI=1/2C5H5N.Cr.3O/c2*1-2-4-6-5-3-1;;;;/h2*1-5H;;;;/r2C5H5N.CrO3/c2*1-2-4-6-5-3-1;2-1(3)4/h2*1-5H; Key: NPRDHMWYZHSAHR-RGHLCDNPAM
- SMILES: c1ccncc1.c1ccncc1.O=[Cr](=O)=O

Properties
Chemical formula	C_{10}H_{10}CrN_{2}O_{3}
Molar mass	258.194
Appearance	Red crystals
Density	1.565 g/cm^{3}
- Except where otherwise noted, data are given for materials in their standard state (at 25 °C [77 °F], 100 kPa). Infobox references

Collins reagent is the complex of chromium(VI) oxide with pyridine in dichloromethane. This metal-pyridine complex, a red solid, is used to oxidize primary alcohols to the corresponding aldehydes and secondary alcohols to the corresponding ketones. This complex is a hygroscopic orange solid.

== Synthesis and structure ==
The complex is produced by treating chromium trioxide with pyridine. The complex is diamagnetic. According to X-ray crystallography, the complex is 5-coordinate with mutually trans pyridine ligands. The Cr-O and Cr-N distances are respectively 163 and 215 picometers.

In terms of history, the complex was first produced by Sisler et al.

== Reactions ==
Collins reagent is especially useful for oxidations of acid sensitive compounds. Primary and secondary alcohols are oxidized respectively to aldehydes and ketones in yields of 87-98%.

Like other oxidations by Cr(VI), the stoichiometry of the oxidations is complex because the metal undergoes 3e reduction and the substrate is oxidized by 2 electrons:

3 RCH_{2}OH + 2 CrO_{3}(pyridine)_{2} → 3 RCHO + 3 H_{2}O + Cr_{2}O_{3} + 4 pyridine

The reagent is typically used in a sixfold excess. Methylene chloride is the typical solvent, with the solubility of 12.5 g/100 ml.

The application of this reagent to oxidations was discovered by G. I. Poos, G. E. Arth, R. E. Beyler and L.H. Sarett in 1953. It was popularized by J. C. Collins several years later.

=== Other reagents ===
- Sarett oxidation
- Oxidation with chromium(VI)-amine complexes

Collins reagent can be used as an alternative to the Jones reagent and pyridinium chlorochromate (PCC) when oxidizing secondary alcohols to ketones. PCC and pyridinium dichromate (PDC) oxidations have largely supplanted Collins oxidation.

== Safety and environmental aspects ==
The solid is flammable. Generally speaking chromium (VI) compounds are carcinogenic.
