= Transition metal pyridine complexes =

Class of chemical compounds

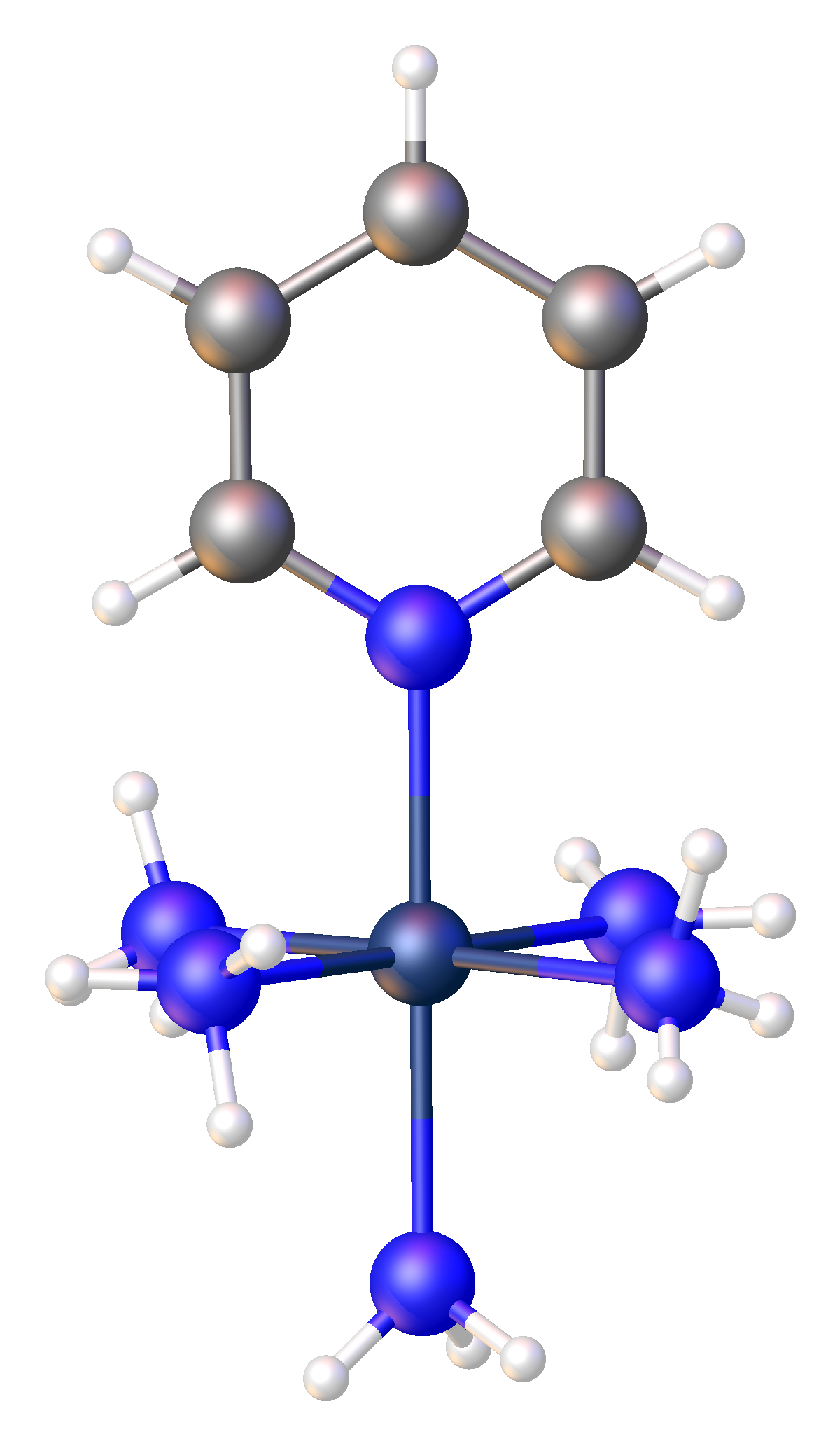
Structure of [Ru(NH_{3})_{5}py]^{2+}, illustrating the steric avoidance of the 2,6-protons and the cis ligands.

Transition metal pyridine complexes encompass many coordination complexes that contain pyridine as a ligand. Most examples are mixed-ligand complexes. Many variants of pyridine are also known to coordinate to metal ions, such as the methylpyridines, quinolines, and more complex rings.

== Bonding ==
With a pK_{a} of 5.25 for its conjugate acid, pyridine is about 15x less basic than imidazole. Pyridine is a weak pi-acceptor ligand. Trends in the M-N distances for complexes of the type [MCl_{2}(py)_{4}]^{2+} reveal an anticorrelation with d-electron count. Low-valent metal complexes of pyridines are known, e.g. Ir^{I}(diene)(pyridine)Cl. The role of pyridine as a Lewis base extends also to main group chemistry. Examples include sulfur trioxide pyridine complex SO_{3}(py) and pyridine adduct of borane, BH_{3}py.

Pyridine is classified as L ligand in the covalent bond classification method. In the usual electron counting method, it is a two-electron ligand. With respect to HSAB theory, it is intermediate softness, reflecting its small but significant properties as a pi-acceptor ligand.

== Classification of metal-pyridine complexes ==
Many metal pyridine complexes are known. These complexes can be classified according to their geometry, i.e. octahedral, tetrahedral, linear, etc.

=== Octahedral complexes ===
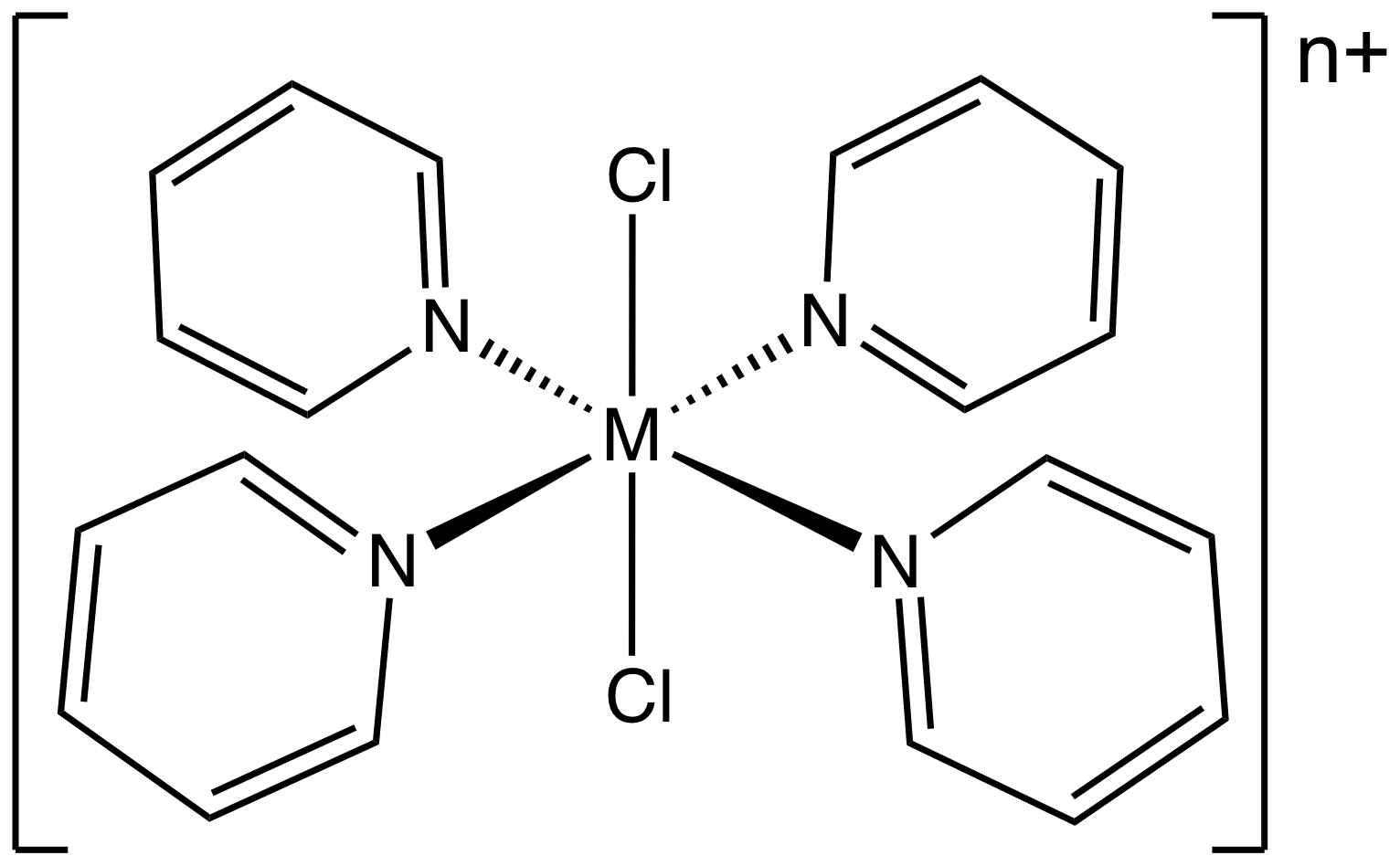
trans-[MCl_{2}(pyridine)_{4}]^{n+} is a common type of transition metal pyridine complex.

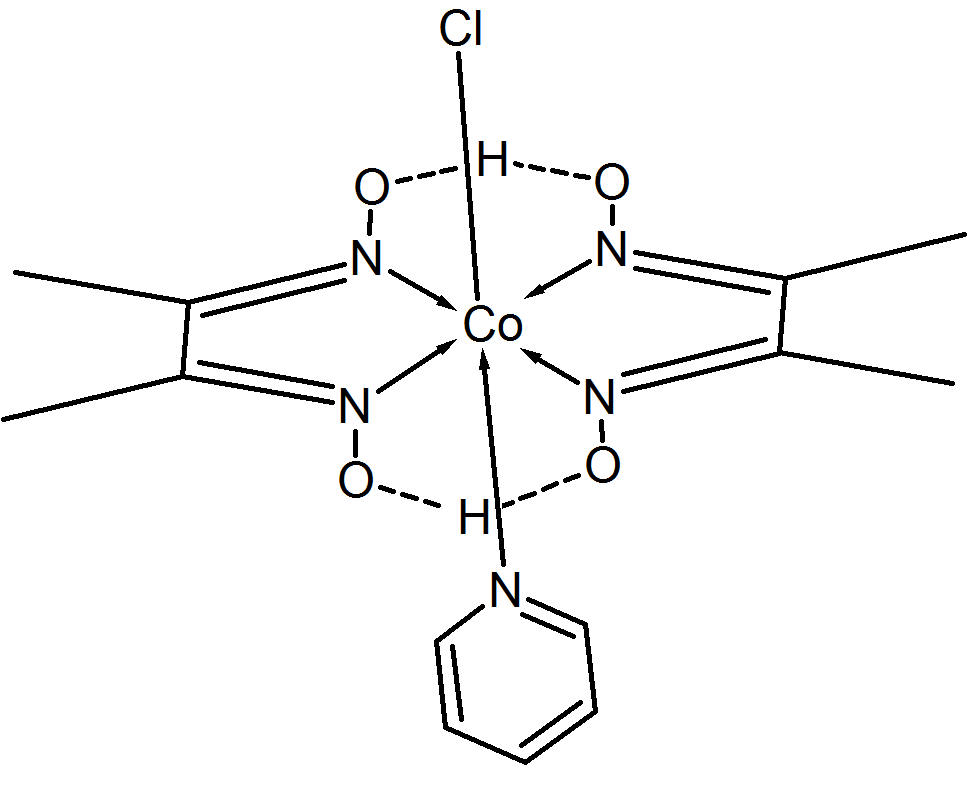
Chloro(pyridine)cobaloxime.

Crabtree's catalyst.

Owing to the relatively wide C-N-C angle, the 2,6-hydrogen atoms interfere with the formation of [M(py)_{6}]^{z} complexes. A few octahedral homoleptic pyridine complexes are known. These complex cations are found in the salts [Ru(py)_{6}]Fe_{4}(CO)_{13} and [Ru(py)_{6}](BF_{4})_{2}. Some compounds with the stoichiometry M(py)_{6}(ClO_{4})_{2} have been reformulated as [M(py)_{4}(ClO_{4})_{2}]^{.}(py)_{2}

A common family of pyridine complexes are of the type [MCl_{2}(py)_{4}]^{n+}. The chloride ligands are mutually trans in these complexes.

MCl_{2}(pyridine)_{4} complexes
formula	CAS RN	key properties	Preparation
TiCl_{2}(pyridine)_{4}	131618-68-3	blue, triplet d_{Ti-N}=2.27 Å, d_{Ti-Cl} = 2.50 Å (thf solvate)	TiCl_{3}(thf)_{3} + KC_{8} + py
VCl_{2}(pyridine)_{4}	15225-42-0	purple	VCl_{3} + Zn + py
CrCl_{2}(pyridine)_{4}	51266-53-6	green d_{Cr-Cl} = 2.80 Å d_{Cr-Cl} = 2.16 Å	CrCl_{2} + py
MnCl_{2}(pyridine)_{4}	14638-48-3	1.383 Å	
FeCl_{2}(pyridine)_{4}	15138-92-8	yellow d_{Fe-Cl} = 2.43 Å	FeCl_{2} + py
CoCl_{2}(pyridine)_{4}	13985-87-0	blue d_{Co-Cl} = 2.44 Å	CoCl_{2} + py
[CoCl_{2}(pyridine)_{4}]Cl	27883-34-7	green (hexahydrate) d_{Co-Cl} = 2.25 Å, d_{Co-N} = 1.98 Å as [CoCl_{3}(py)]^{−} salt	CoCl_{2}(pyridine)_{4} + Cl_{2}
NiCl_{2}(pyridine)_{4}	14076-99-4	blue d_{Ni-Cl} = 2.44 Å	NiCl_{2} + py
NbCl_{2}(pyridine)_{4}	168701-43-7	d_{Nb-N} = 2.22 Å, d_{Nb-Cl} = 2.51 Å	NbCl_{4}(thf)_{2} + KC_{8} + py
[MoCl_{2}py)_{4}]Br_{3}		Br_{3}^{−} salt	yellow d_{Mo-Cl}= 2.41 Å, d_{Mo-N}=2.20 Å
TcCl_{2}py)_{4}	172140-87-3	purple d_{Tc-Cl} = 2.41 Å, d_{Tc-N} = 2.10 Å	TcCl_{4}py_{2} + Zn + py
RuCl_{2}(pyridine)_{4}	16997-43-6	red-orange d_{Ru-N}=2.08 Å, d_{Ru-Cl}=2.40 Å	RuCl_{3}(H_{2}O)_{x} + py
[RhCl_{2}(pyridine)_{4}]^{+}	14077-30-6 (Cl^{−} salt)	yellow	RhCl_{3}(H_{2}O)_{3} + py + cat. reductant
OsCl_{2}(pyridine)_{4}	137822-02-7	brown d_{Os-Cl} = 2.40 Å, d_{Os-N}= 2.068 Å	K_{3}OsCl_{6} + py + (CH_{2}OH)_{2}/140 °C
[IrCl_{2}(pyridine)_{4}]^{+}		yellow 1.35 Å (chloride^{.}hexahydrate)	

The tris(pyridine) trihalides, i.e., [MCl_{3}(py)_{3}] (M = Ti, Cr, Rh Ir), are another large class of M-Cl-py complexes.

=== Four-coordinate complexes ===
Structure of CrO_{3}(pyridine)_{2} ("Collins reagent")

Four-coordinate complexes include tetrahedral and square planar derivatives. Examples of homoleptic tetrahedral complexes include [M(py)_{4}]^{n+} for M^{n+} = Cu^{+}, M = Ni^{2+}, Ag^{+}, and Ag^{2+}. Examples of homoleptic square planar complexes include the d^{8} cations [M(py)_{4}]^{n+} for M^{n+} = Pd^{2+}, Pt^{2+}, Au^{3+}.

Ni(ClO_{4})_{2}(3-picoline)_{2} can be isolated in two isomers, yellow, diamagnetic square planar or blue, paramagnetic tetrahedral.

Mn(II) and Co(II) form both tetrahedral MCl_{2}py_{2} and octahedral MCl_{2}py_{4} complexes, depending on conditions:

MCl_{2}py_{2} + 2 py → MCl_{2}py_{4}

=== Two- and three-coordinate complexes ===
Many examples exist for [Au(py)_{2}]^{+}. [Ag(py)_{3}]^{+} and [Cu(py)_{2}]^{+} are also precedented.

=== Pi-complexes ===
The η^{6} coordination mode, as occurs in η^{6} benzene complexes, is observed only in sterically encumbered derivatives that block the nitrogen center.

== Comparison with related ligands ==
=== Picolines ===
Many substituted pyridines function as ligands for transition metals. The monomethyl derivatives, the picolines (2-, 3-, and 4-picoline), are best studied. 2-Picolines are sterically impeded from coordination.

=== 2,2'-bipy ===
Coupling of two pyridine rings at their 2-positions gives 2,2'-bipyridine, a widely studied bidentate ligand. A number of differences are apparent between pyridine and bipyridine complexes. Many [M(bipy)_{3}]^{z} complexes are known, whereas analogous [M(py)_{6}]^{z} complexes are rare and apparently labile. Bipyridine is a redox-noninnocent ligand, as illustrated by the existence of complexes such as [Cr(bipy)_{3}]^{0}. The pyridine analogues of such complexes are unknown. The dichloro complexes [MCl_{2}(bipy)_{2}]^{n+} tend to be cis, as exemplified by RuCl_{2}(bipy)_{2}. In contrast, the complexes [MCl_{2}(py)_{4}]^{n+} are always trans.

=== Imidazoles ===
Imidazoles comprise another major series of N-heterocyclic ligands. Unlike pyridines, imidazole derivatives are common ligands in nature.

== Applications and occurrence ==
Crabtree's catalyst, a popular catalyst for hydrogenations, is a pyridine complex.

Although transition metal pyridine complexes have few large-scale commercial applications, they are widely used synthetic precursors. Many are anhydrous, soluble in nonpolar solvents, and susceptible to alkylation by organolithium and Grignard reagents. Thus CoCl_{2}(py)4 has proven useful in organocobalt chemistry and NiCl_{2}(py)_{4} useful in organonickel chemistry. Collins reagent, the complex CrO_{3}(pyridine)_{2} whose structure is depicted above, is a reagent in organic chemistry.
