= Organic redox reaction =

Redox reaction that takes place with organic compounds

Organic redox reactions: the Birch reduction

Organic reductions or organic oxidations or organic redox reactions are redox reactions that take place with organic compounds. In organic chemistry oxidations and reductions are different from ordinary redox reactions, because many reactions carry the name but do not actually involve electron transfer. Instead the relevant criterion for organic oxidation is gain of oxygen and/or loss of hydrogen. Simple functional groups can be arranged in order of increasing oxidation state. The oxidation numbers are only an approximation:

oxidation number	compounds
−4	methane
−3	alkanes
−2, −1	alkanes, alkenes, alcohols, alkyl halides, amines
0	alkynes, geminal diols
+1	aldehydes
+2	chloroform, hydrogen cyanide, ketones
+3	carboxylic acids, amides, nitriles (alkyl cyanides)
+4	carbon dioxide, tetrachloromethane

When methane is oxidized to carbon dioxide its oxidation number changes from −4 to +4. Classical reductions include alkene reduction to alkanes and classical oxidations include oxidation of alcohols to aldehydes. In oxidations electrons are removed and the electron density of a molecule is reduced. In reductions electron density increases when electrons are added to the molecule. This terminology is always centered on the organic compound. For example, it is usual to refer to the reduction of a ketone by lithium aluminium hydride, but not to the oxidation of lithium aluminium hydride by a ketone. Many oxidations involve removal of hydrogen atoms from the organic molecule, and reduction adds hydrogens to an organic molecule.

Many reactions classified as reductions also appear in other classes. For instance, conversion of the ketone to an alcohol by lithium aluminium hydride can be considered a reduction but the hydride is also a good nucleophile in nucleophilic substitution. Many redox reactions in organic chemistry have coupling reaction reaction mechanism involving free radical intermediates. True organic redox chemistry can be found in electrochemical organic synthesis or electrosynthesis. Examples of organic reactions that can take place in an electrochemical cell are the Kolbe electrolysis.

In disproportionation reactions the reactant is both oxidized and reduced in the same chemical reaction forming two separate compounds.

Asymmetric catalytic reductions and asymmetric catalytic oxidations are important in asymmetric synthesis.

== Organic oxidations ==
Most oxidations are conducted with air or oxygen, especially in industry. These oxidation include routes to chemical compounds, remediation of pollutants, and combustion. Some commercially important oxidations are listed:

Industrial oxidations of organic compounds
product	scale (millions of tons/year in 1990's)
terephthalic acid and esters	15
cumylhydroperoxide	6.5
benzoic acid	0.28
adipic acid	2.2
propylene oxide	4
adipic acid	2.2

Many reagents have been invented for organic oxidations. Organic oxidations reagents are usually classified according to the functional group attacked by the oxidant:

- Oxidation of C-H bonds:

R_{3}CH + O → R_{3}COH
R_{2}CH_{2} + O → R_{2}CH(OH)
R_{2}CH(OH) + O → R_{2}CO + H_{2}O
RCH_{3} + O → RCH_{2}(OH)
RCH_{2}(OH) + O → RCHO + H_{2}O
RCHO + O → RCO_{2}H

- Oxidation of C-C, C=C, and C≡C bonds
- Oxidation of alcohols and various carbonyls

Often the substrate to be oxidized features more than one functional group. In such cases, selective oxidations become important.

== Organic reductions ==
In organic chemistry, reduction is equivalent to the addition of hydrogen atoms, usually in pairs. The reaction of unsaturated organic compounds with hydrogen gas is called hydrogenation. The reaction of saturated organic compounds with hydrogen gas is called hydrogenolysis. Hydrogenolyses necessarily cleaves C-X bonds (X = C, O, N, etc.). Reductions can also be effected by adding hydride and proton sources, the so-called heterolytic pathway. Such reactions are often effected using stoichiometric hydride reagents such as sodium borohydride or lithium aluminium hydride.

== See also ==
- Oxidizing agent
- Reducing agent
- Transfer hydrogenation
- Electrosynthesis

=== Functional group oxidations ===
- Alcohol oxidation
- Oxidation of oximes and primary amines to nitro compounds
- Glycol cleavage
- Oxidative cleavage of α-Hydroxy acids
- Alkene oxidations
- Oxidation of primary amines to nitriles
- Oxidation of thiols to sulfonic acids
- Oxidation of hydrazines to azo compounds

=== Functional group reductions ===
- Carbonyl reduction
- Amide reduction
- Nitrile reduction
- Reduction of nitro compounds
- Reduction of imines and Schiff bases
- Reduction of aromatic compounds to saturated rings
