= Pyridinium chlorochromate =

- Chemical structure of pyridinium chlorochromate

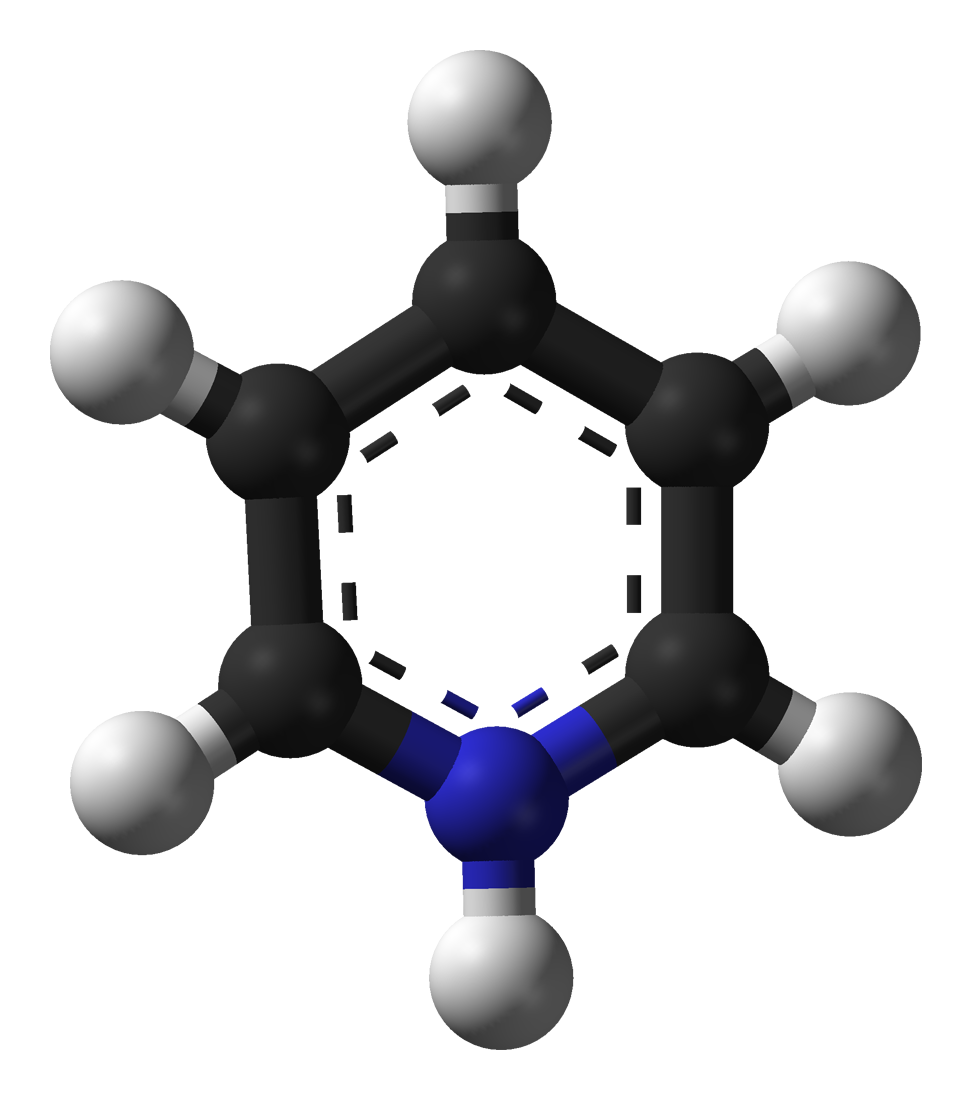
Ball-and-stick model of the pyridinium cation
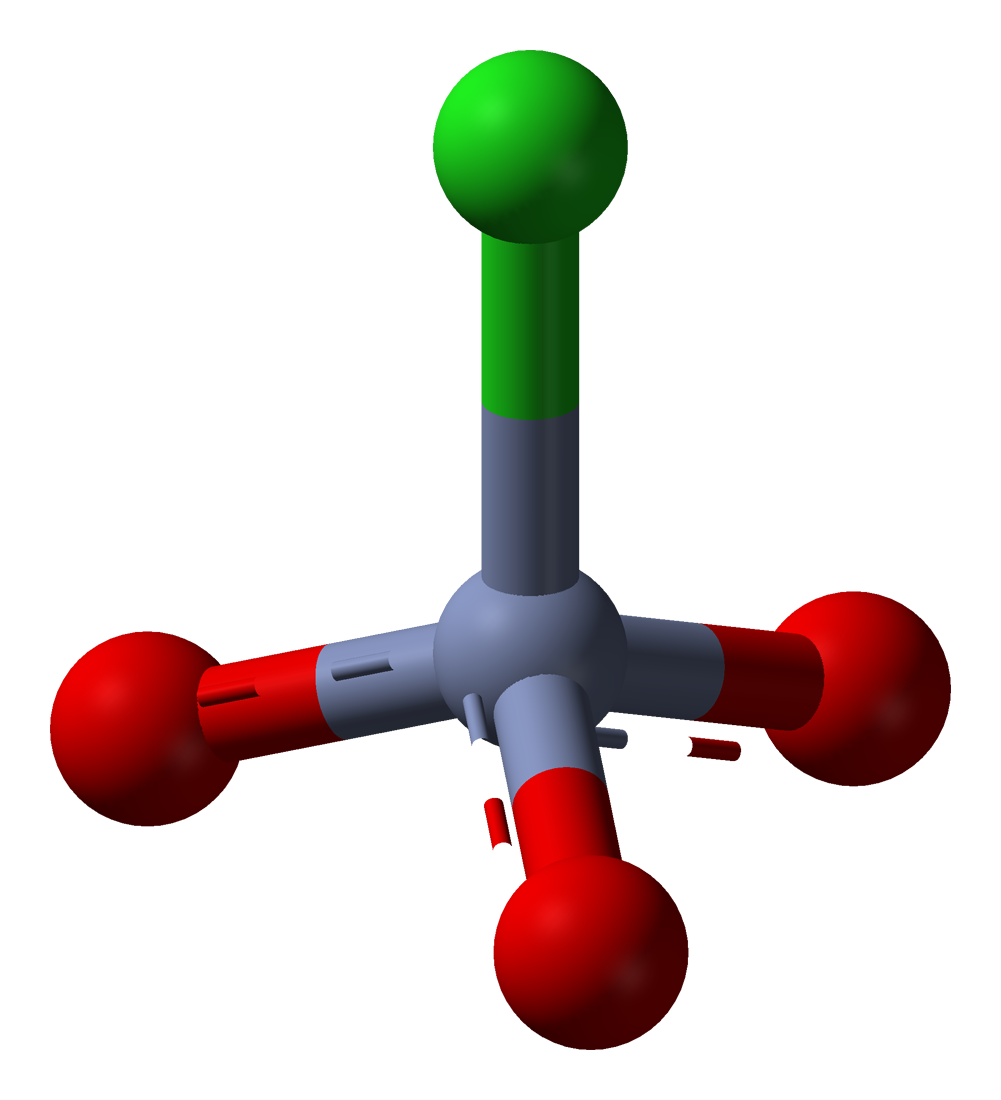
Ball-and-stick model of the chlorochromate anion

Names
- IUPAC name Pyridinium chlorochromate
- Other names PCC; Corey–Suggs reagent

Identifiers
CAS Number	26299-14-9
3D model (JSmol)	Interactive image
ChEBI	CHEBI:176795
ChemSpider	10608386
ECHA InfoCard	100.043.253
EC Number	247-595-5
PubChem CID	129695875
UNII	DTV5HU1N27
CompTox Dashboard (EPA)	DTXSID40893953
- InChI: InChI=1S/C5H5N.ClH.Cr.3O/c1-2-4-6-5-3-1;;;;;/h1-5H;1H;;;;/q;;+1;;;-1 Key: LEHBURLTIWGHEM-UHFFFAOYSA-N; InChI=1/C5H5N.ClH.Cr.3O/c1-2-4-6-5-3-1;;;;;/h1-5H;1H;;;;/q;;+1;;;-1/rC5H5N.ClCrO3/c1-2-4-6-5-3-1;1-2(3,4)5/h1-5H;/q;-1/p+1 Key: LEHBURLTIWGHEM-YOEUSAHMAN
- SMILES: C1=CC=[NH+]C=C1.[O-][Cr](=O)(=O)Cl

Properties
Chemical formula	C_{5}H_{6}ClCrNO_{3}
Molar mass	215.55 g·mol^{−1}
Appearance	yellow-orange solid
Melting point	205 °C (401 °F; 478 K)
Solubility in other solvents	soluble in acetone, acetonitrile, THF

Hazards
- Occupational safety and health (OHS/OSH)
Main hazards	Toxic, oxidizer, carcinogenic, strong environmental pollutant
- GHS labelling
Pictograms	(GHS03: Oxidizing) (GHS08: Health hazard) (GHS07: Exclamation mark) (GHS09: Environmental hazard)
Signal word	Danger
Hazard statements	H272, H317, H350, H410
Precautionary statements	P201, P221, P273, P280, P302+P352, P308+P313
NFPA 704 (fire diamond)	2 1 2 OX
- Except where otherwise noted, data are given for materials in their standard state (at 25 °C [77 °F], 100 kPa). verify (what is ?) Infobox references

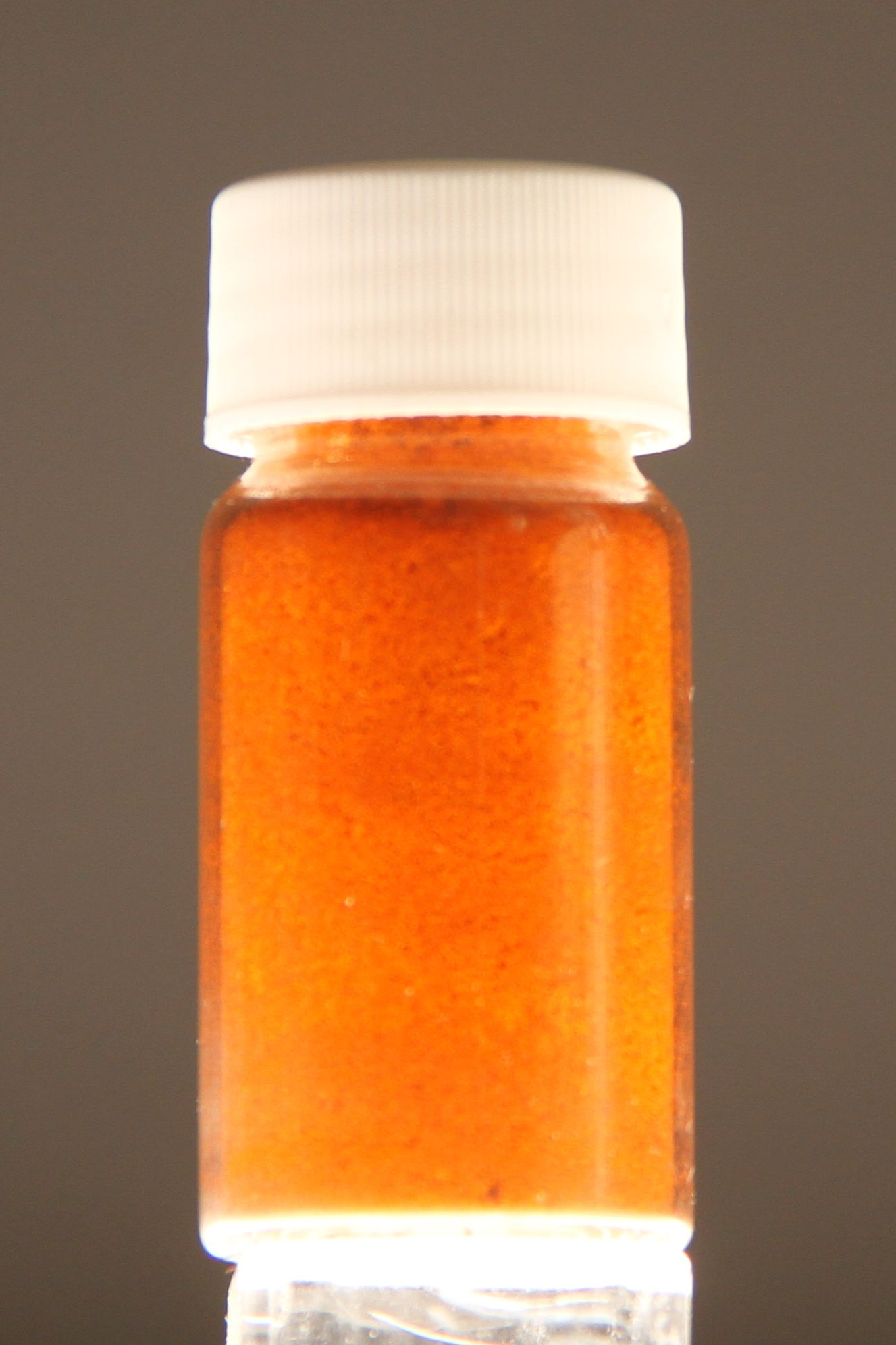
Pyridinium chlorochromate in a vial

Pyridinium chlorochromate (PCC), also known as the Corey–Suggs reagent, is a yellow-orange salt with the formula [C_{5}H_{5}NH]^{+}[CrO_{3}Cl]^{−}. It is a reagent in organic synthesis used primarily for oxidation of alcohols to form carbonyls. A variety of related compounds are known with similar reactivity. PCC offers the advantage of the selective oxidation of alcohols to aldehydes or ketones, whereas many other reagents are less selective.

== Structure and preparation ==
PCC consists of a pyridinium cation, [C_{5}H_{5}NH]^{+}, and a tetrahedral chlorochromate anion, [CrO_{3}Cl]^{−}. Related salts are also known, such as 1-butylpyridinium chlorochromate, [C_{5}H_{5}N(C_{4}H_{9})][CrO_{3}Cl] and potassium chlorochromate.

PCC is commercially available. Discovered by accident, the reagent was originally prepared via addition of pyridine into a cold solution of chromium trioxide in concentrated hydrochloric acid:

C_{5}H_{5}N + HCl + CrO_{3} → [C_{5}H_{5}NH][CrO_{3}Cl]

In one alternative method, formation of toxic chromyl chloride (CrO_{2}Cl_{2}) fumes during the making of the aforementioned solution were minimized by simply changing the order of addition: a cold solution of pyridine in concentrated hydrochloric acid was added to solid chromium trioxide under stirring.

== Uses ==
=== Oxidation of alcohols ===
PCC is used as an oxidant. In particular, it has proven to be highly effective in oxidizing primary and secondary alcohols to aldehydes and ketones, respectively. The reagent is more selective than the related Jones' Reagent, so there is little chance of over-oxidation to form carboxylic acids if acidified potassium permanganate is used as long as water is not present in the reaction mixture. A typical PCC oxidation involves addition of an alcohol to a suspension of PCC in dichloromethane. The general reaction is:

2 [C_{5}H_{5}NH][CrO_{3}Cl] + 3 R_{2}CHOH → 2 [C_{5}H_{5}NH]Cl + Cr_{2}O_{3} + 3 R_{2}C=O + 3 H_{2}O

For example, the triterpene lupeol was oxidized to lupenone:

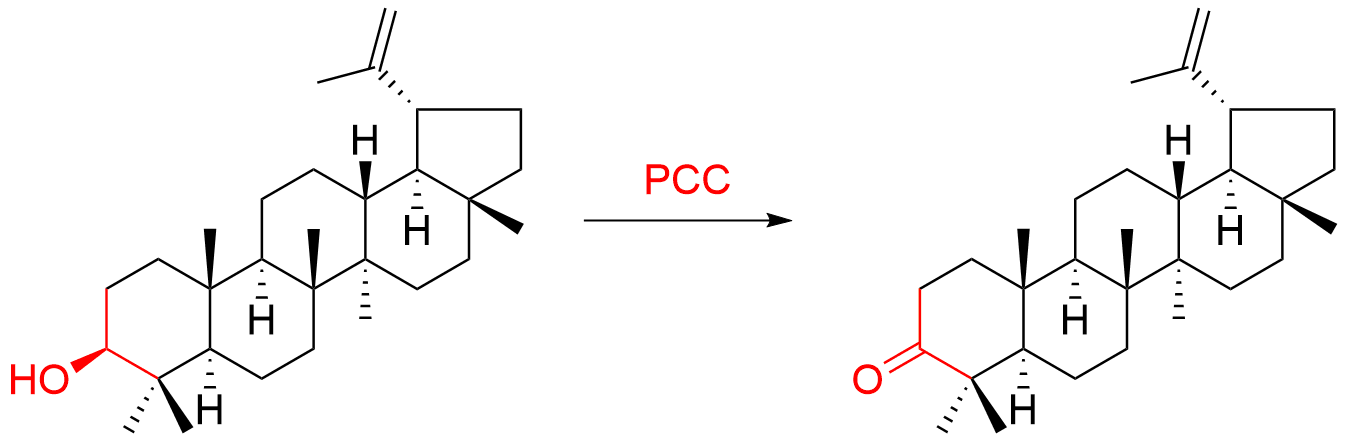

=== Babler oxidation ===
With tertiary alcohols, the chromate ester formed from PCC can isomerize via a [3,3]-sigmatropic reaction and following oxidation yield an enone, in a reaction known as the Babler oxidation:

This type of oxidative transposition reaction has been synthetically utilized, e.g. for the synthesis of morphine.

Using other common oxidants in the place of PCC usually leads to dehydration, because such alcohols cannot be oxidized directly.

=== Other reactions ===
PCC also converts suitable unsaturated alcohols and aldehydes to cyclohexenones. This pathway, an oxidative cationic cyclization, is illustrated by the conversion of (−)-citronellol to (−)-pulegone.

PCC also effects allylic oxidations, for example, in conversion of dihydrofurans to furanones.

== Related reagents ==
Other more convenient or less toxic reagents for oxidizing alcohols include dimethyl sulfoxide, which is used in Swern and Pfitzner–Moffatt oxidations, and hypervalent iodine compounds, such as the Dess–Martin periodinane.

== Safety ==
One disadvantage to the use of PCC is its toxicity, which it shares with other hexavalent chromium compounds.

== See also ==
- Oxidation with chromium(VI)-amine complexes
