= Chromium trioxide =

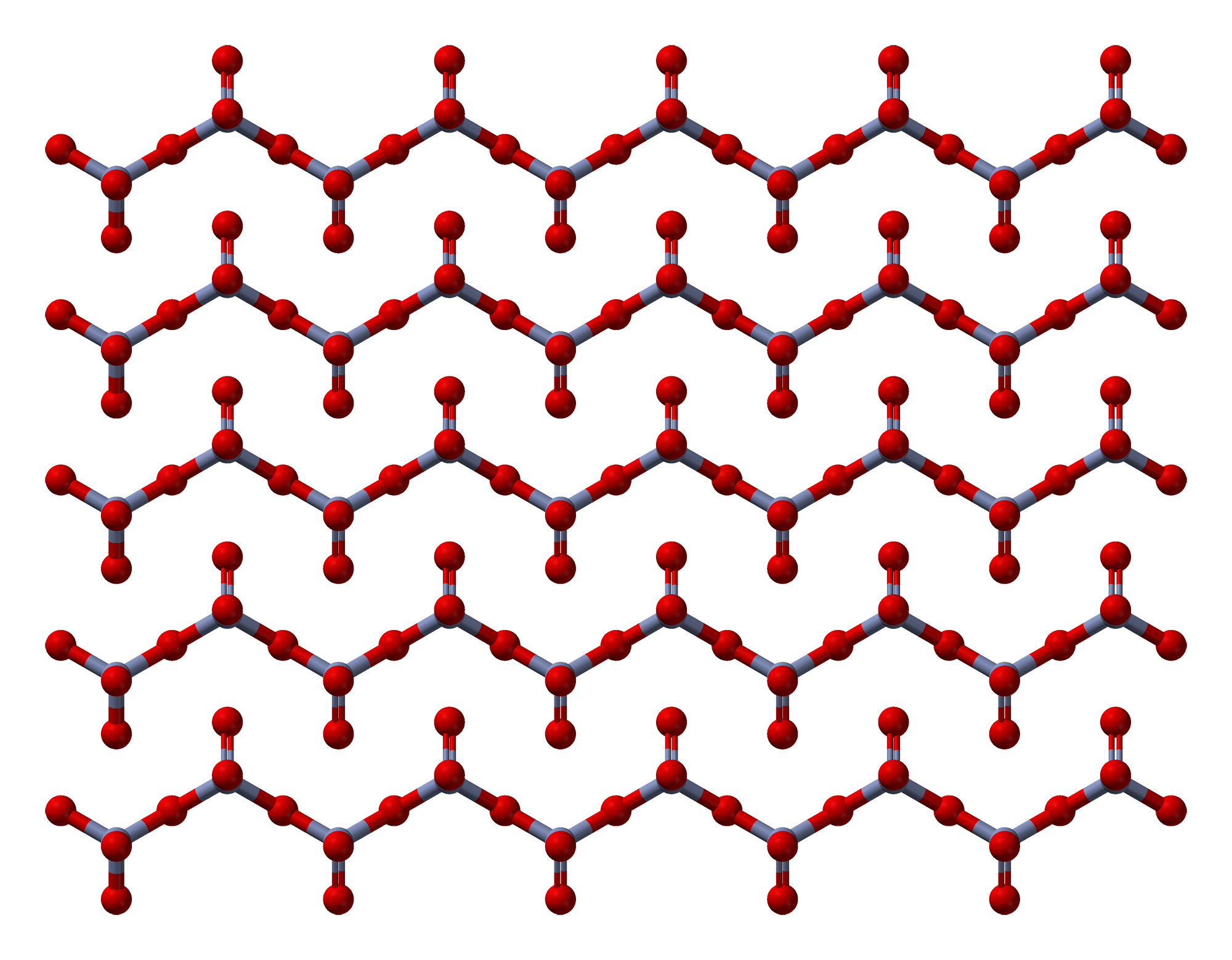
- Ball-and-stick model of chromium trioxide Chromium, Cr Oxygen, O

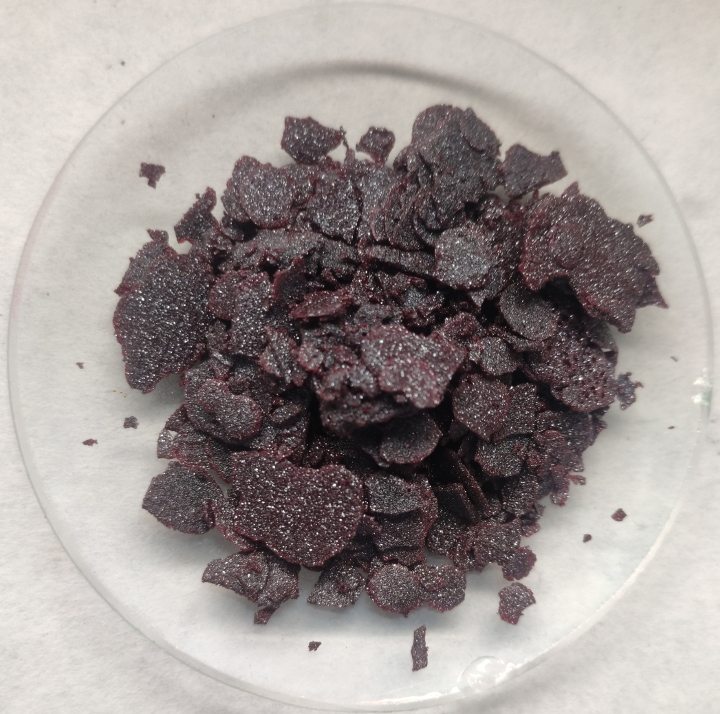
- Powder of chromium trioxide

Names
- IUPAC name Chromium trioxide
- Other names Chromic anhydride, Chromium(VI) oxide, Chromic acid (misnomer)

Identifiers
CAS Number	1333-82-0
3D model (JSmol)	Interactive image
ChEBI	CHEBI:48240
ChemSpider	14212
ECHA InfoCard	100.014.189
PubChem CID	14915
RTECS number	GB6650000
UNII	8LV49809UC
UN number	1463
CompTox Dashboard (EPA)	DTXSID0040125
- InChI: InChI=1S/Cr.3O Key: WGLPBDUCMAPZCE-UHFFFAOYSA-N; InChI=1/Cr.3O/rCrO3/c2-1(3)4 Key: WGLPBDUCMAPZCE-YFSAMUSXAF
- SMILES: O=[Cr](=O)=O

Properties
Chemical formula	CrO_{3}
Molar mass	99.993 g·mol^{−1}
Appearance	Dark red granular solid, deliquescent
Odor	Odorless
Density	2.7 g/cm^{3} (20 °C)
Melting point	197 °C (387 °F; 470 K)
Boiling point	250 °C (482 °F; 523 K) decomposes
Solubility in water	164.8 g/(100 mL) (0 °C); 169 g/(100 mL) (25 °C); 172.6 g/(100 mL) (40 °C); 198.1 g/(100 mL) (100 °C)
Solubility	Soluble in H_{2}SO_{4}, HNO_{3}, (CH_{3}CH_{2})_{2}O, CH_{3}COOH, (CH_{3})_{2}CO
Magnetic susceptibility (χ)	+40·10^{−6} cm^{3}/mol

Thermochemistry
Std molar entropy (S^{⦵}_{298})	73.2 J/(mol·K)
Std enthalpy of formation (Δ_{f}H^{⦵}_{298})	−589.3 kJ/mol

Hazards
- GHS labelling
Pictograms	(GHS03: Oxidizing) (GHS05: Corrosive) (GHS06: Toxic) (GHS08: Health hazard) (GHS09: Environmental hazard)
Signal word	Danger
Hazard statements	H271, H301+H311, H314, H317, H330, H334, H335, H340, H350, H361f, H372, H410
Precautionary statements	P210, P260, P280, P303+P361+P353, P304+P340+P310, P305+P351+P338
NFPA 704 (fire diamond)	4 0 2 OX
- Lethal dose or concentration (LD, LC)
LD_{50} (median dose)	80 mg/kg (rats, oral)
Safety data sheet (SDS)	ICSC 1194
- Except where otherwise noted, data are given for materials in their standard state (at 25 °C [77 °F], 100 kPa). verify (what is ?) Infobox references

Chromium trioxide (also known as chromium(VI) oxide or chromic anhydride) is the inorganic compound with the formula CrO_{3}. It is the acidic anhydride of chromic acid, and is sometimes marketed under the same name.

This compound is a dark-purple solid. Millions of kilograms are produced annually, mainly for electroplating. Chromium trioxide is a powerful oxidiser, a mutagen, and a carcinogen.

== Production and structure ==
Chromium trioxide is generated by treating sodium dichromate with sulfuric acid:

H_{2}SO_{4} + Na_{2}Cr_{2}O_{7} → 2 CrO_{3} + Na_{2}SO_{4} + H_{2}O

Approximately 100,000 tonnes are produced annually by this or similar routes.

The solid consists of chains of tetrahedrally coordinated chromium atoms that share vertices. Each chromium center therefore shares two oxygen centers with neighbors. Two oxygen atoms are not shared, giving an overall stoichiometry of 1:3.

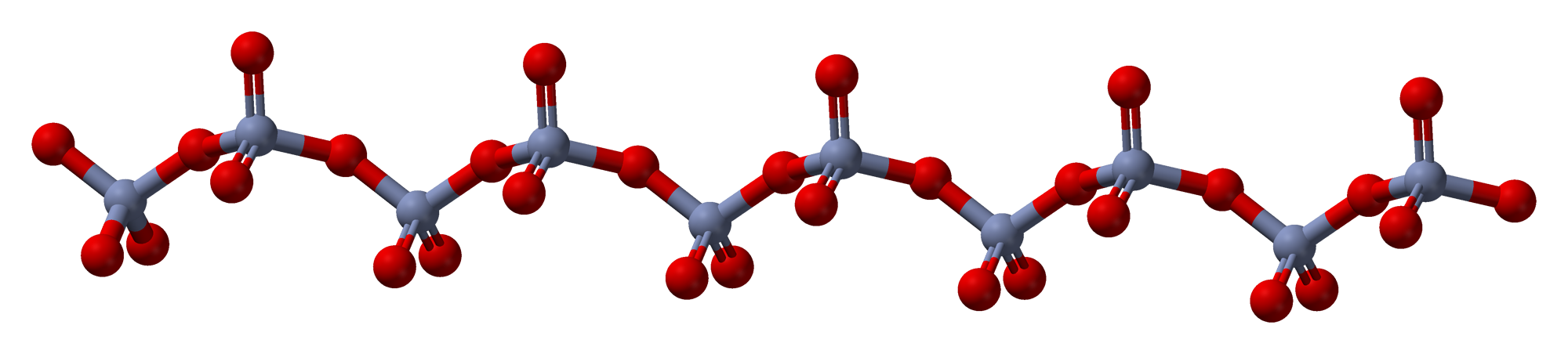
Ball-and-stick model of chains in the crystal structure of CrO_{3} Chromium, Cr Oxygen, O

The structure of monomeric CrO_{3} has been calculated using density functional theory, and is predicted to be pyramidal (point group C_{3v}) rather than planar (point group D_{3h}).

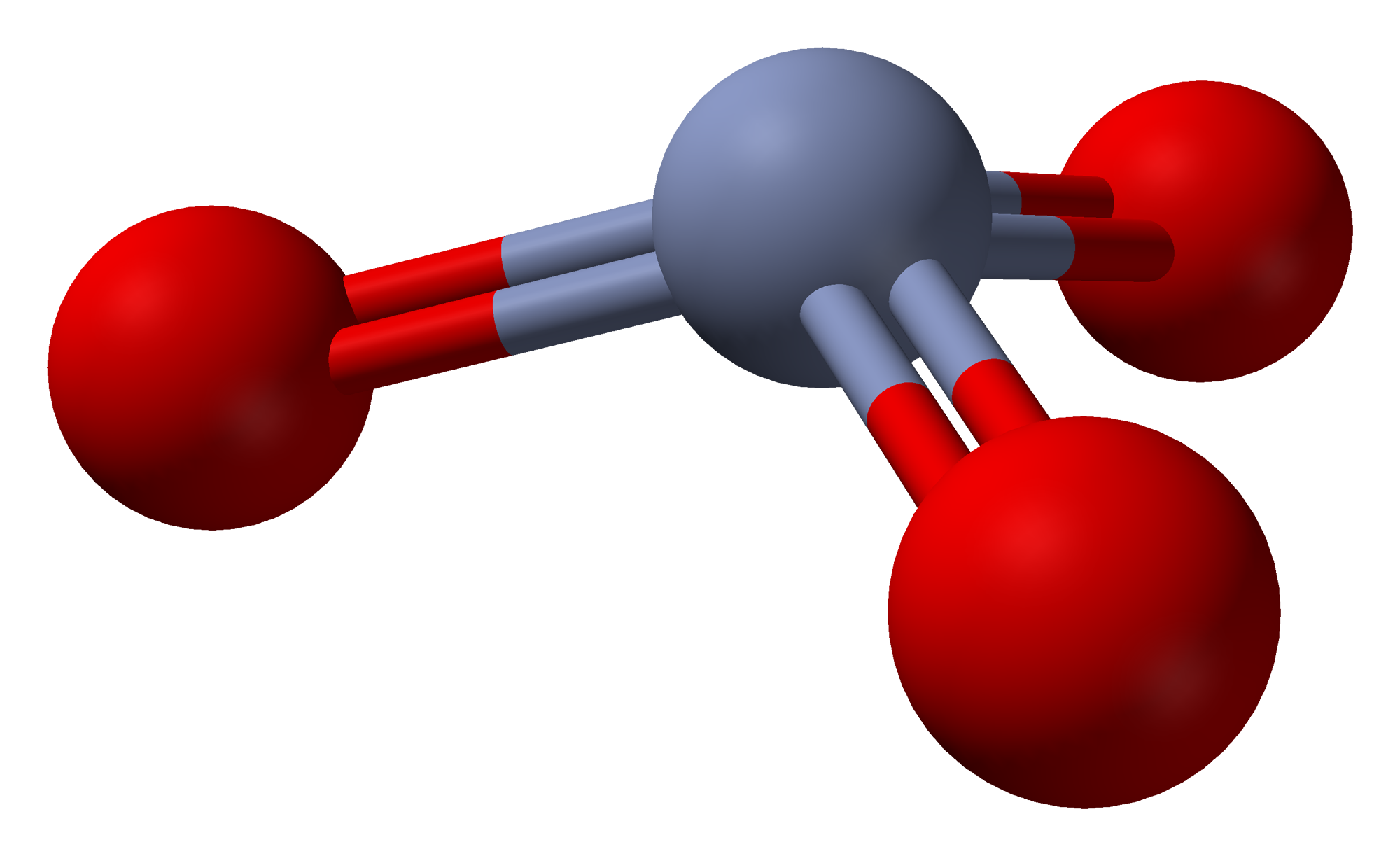

== Reactions ==
Chromium trioxide decomposes above 197 °C, liberating oxygen and eventually giving Cr_{2}O_{3}:

4 CrO_{3} → 2 Cr_{2}O_{3} + 3 O_{2}

With water it converts to "chromic acid", which includes red-orange species such as H_{2}CrO_{4} and H_{2}Cr_{2}O_{7}.

Chromium trioxide is a Lewis acid, forming adducts with many (non-oxidizable) bases, such as chloride:

CrO_{3} + Cl^{−} → CrO_{3}Cl^{−}

== Applications ==
Chromium trioxide is mainly used in chrome plating. It is typically employed with additives that affect the plating process but do not react with the trioxide. The trioxide reacts with cadmium, zinc, and other metals to generate passivating chromate films that resist corrosion. It is also used in the production of synthetic rubies. Chromic acid solution is also used in applying types of anodic coating to aluminium, which are primarily used in aerospace applications. On the International Space Station, it is used to control bacteria growth in the wastewater storage tank. A chromic acid/phosphoric acid solution is also the preferred stripping agent of anodic coatings of all types.

=== Organic chemistry ===
Chromium trioxide and a variety of its derivatives are used in organic chemistry. Some of these reagents:

- CrO_{3}(pyridine)_{2}. When dissolved in pyridine, this complex is called Sarett's reagent.
- Collins reagent is a solution CrO_{3}(pyridine)_{2} but in dichloromethane.
- pyridinium chlorochromate (PCC) is the pyridinium salt of the chloride adduct of chromium trichloride, [CrO_{3}Cl]^{−}.

Typically these reagents convert alcohols to carbonyls:

4 CrO_{3} + 3 RCH_{2}OH + 12 H^{+} → 3 RCOOH + 4 Cr^{3+} + 9 H_{2}O
2 CrO_{3} + 3 R_{2}CHOH + 6 H^{+} → 3 R_{2}C=O + 2 Cr^{3+} + 6 H_{2}O

== Safety ==
Chromium trioxide is highly toxic, corrosive, and carcinogenic. It is the main example of hexavalent chromium, an environmental hazard. The related chromium(III) derivatives are not particularly dangerous; thus, reductants are used to destroy chromium(VI) samples.

Chromium trioxide, being a powerful oxidizer, will ignite organic materials such as alcohols on contact.

== Images ==
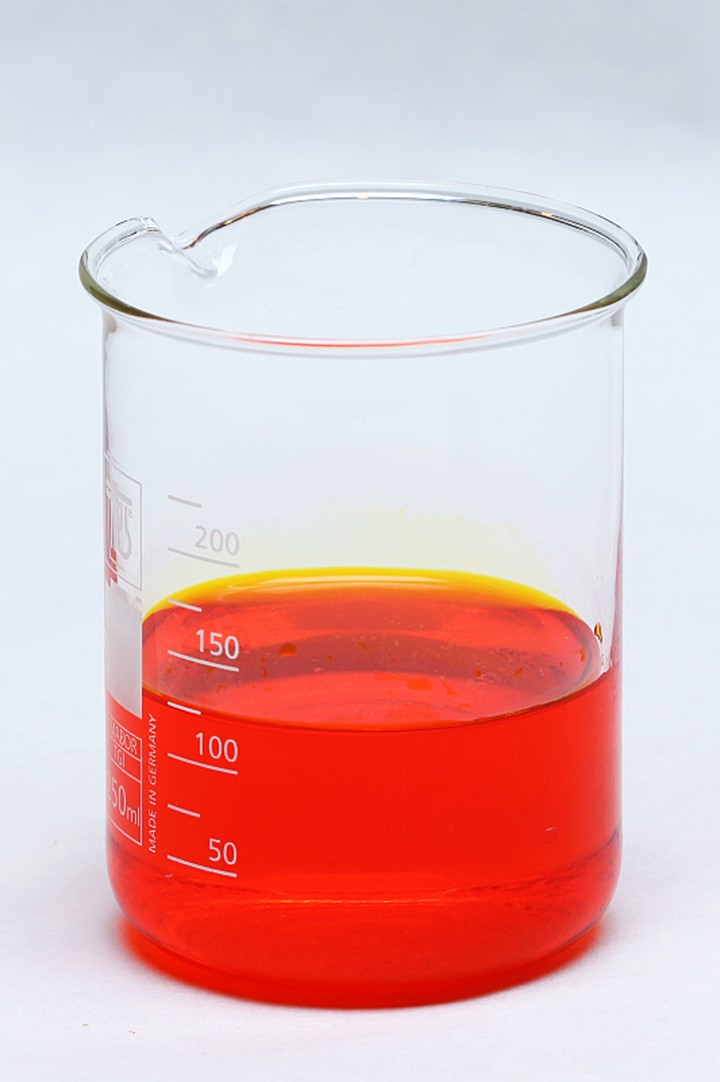
A concentrated solution of potassium dichromate in water.

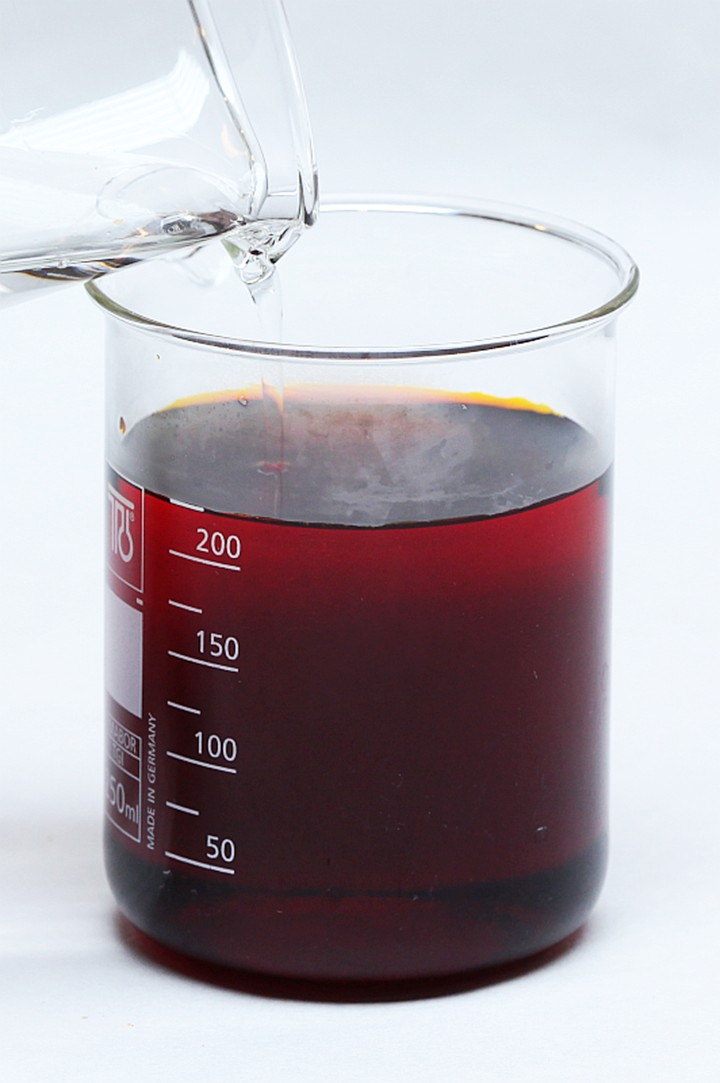
Addition of sulfuric acid to the solution.

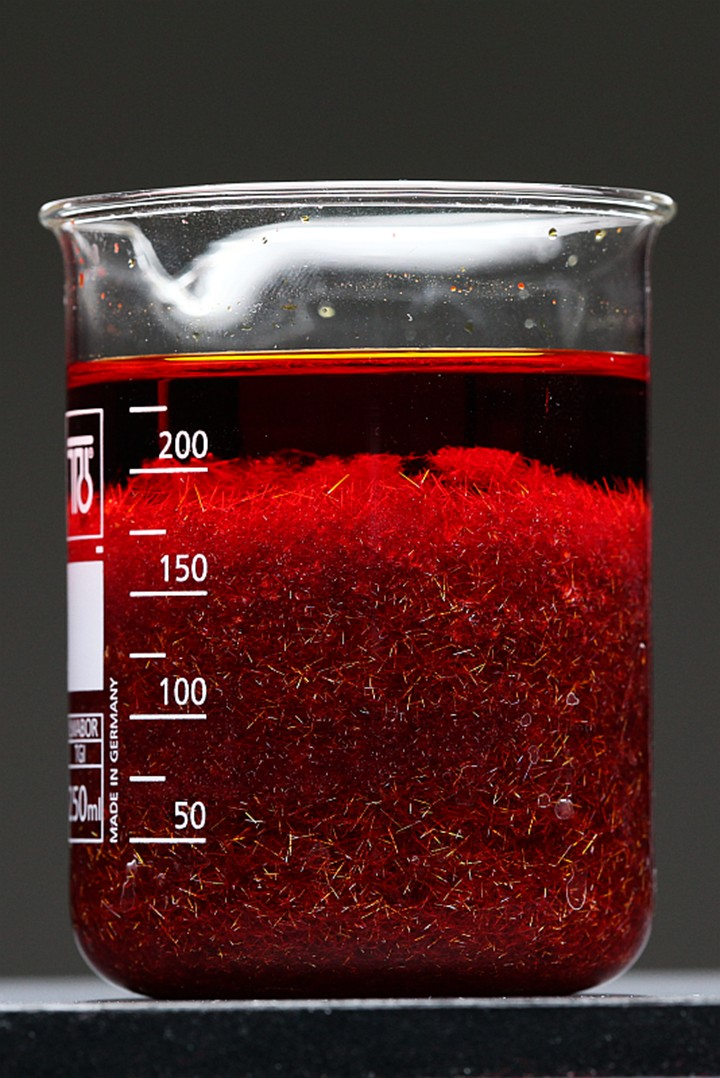
Crystallization of chromium trioxide from the reaction.
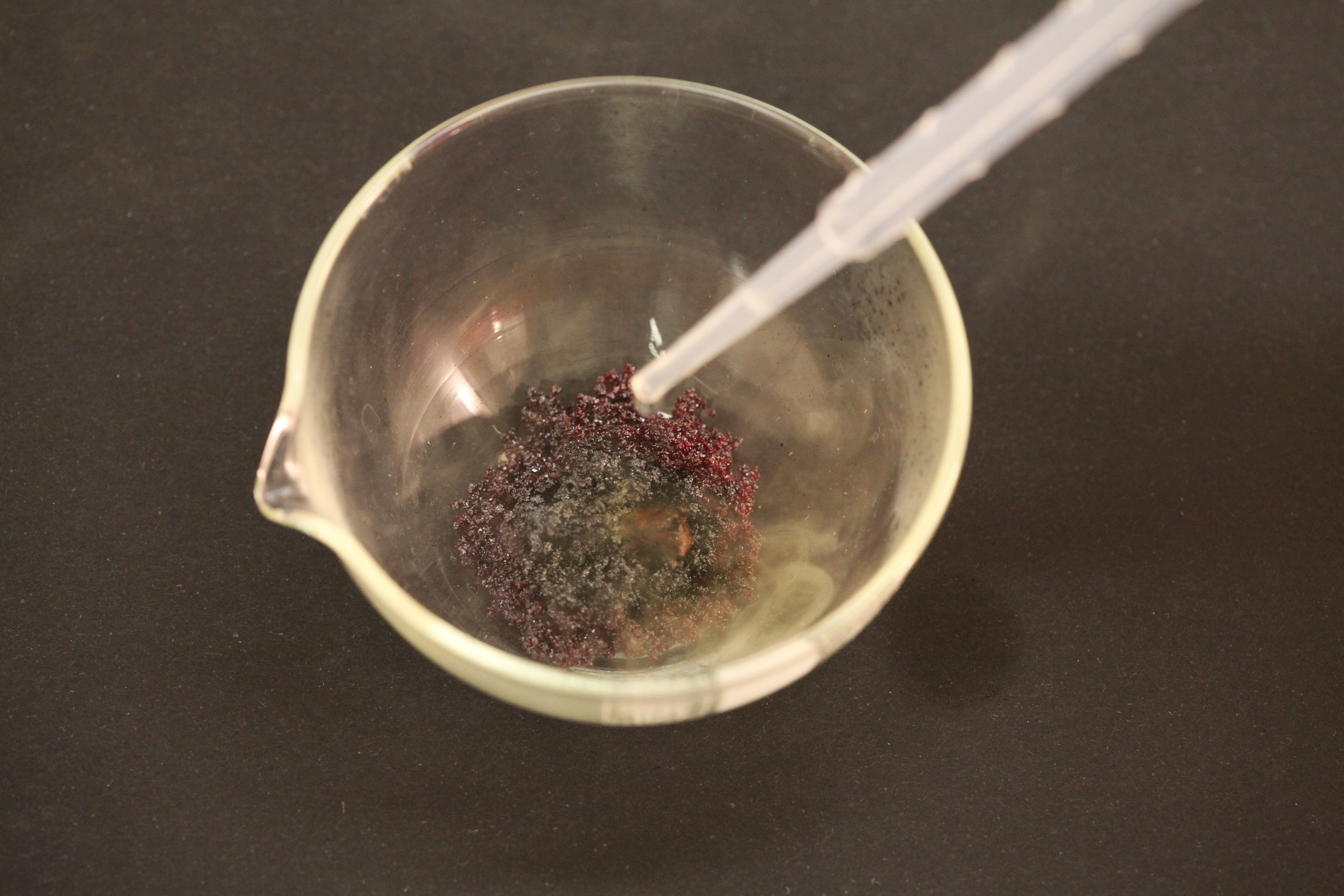
Reaction between chromium trioxide and ethanol

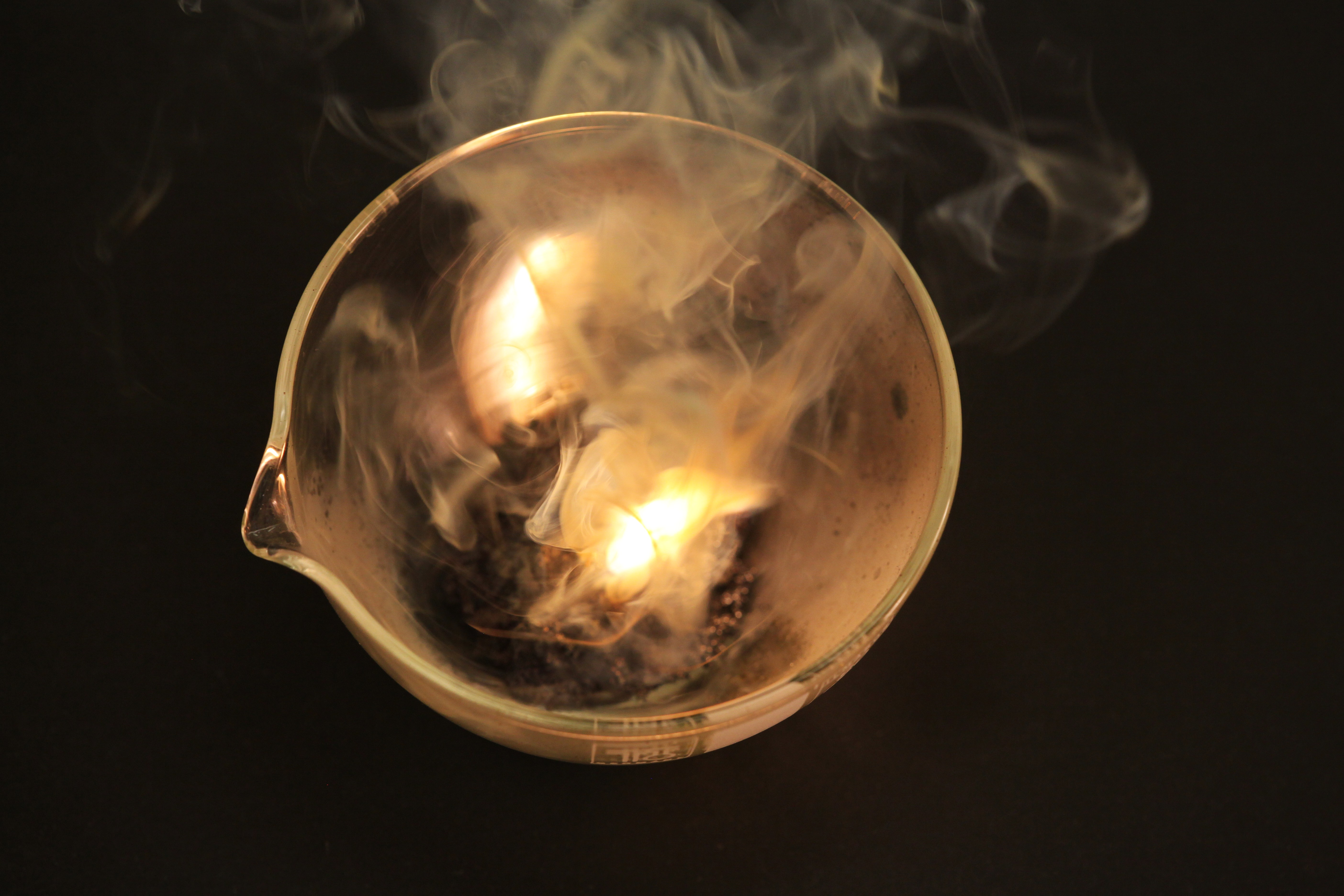

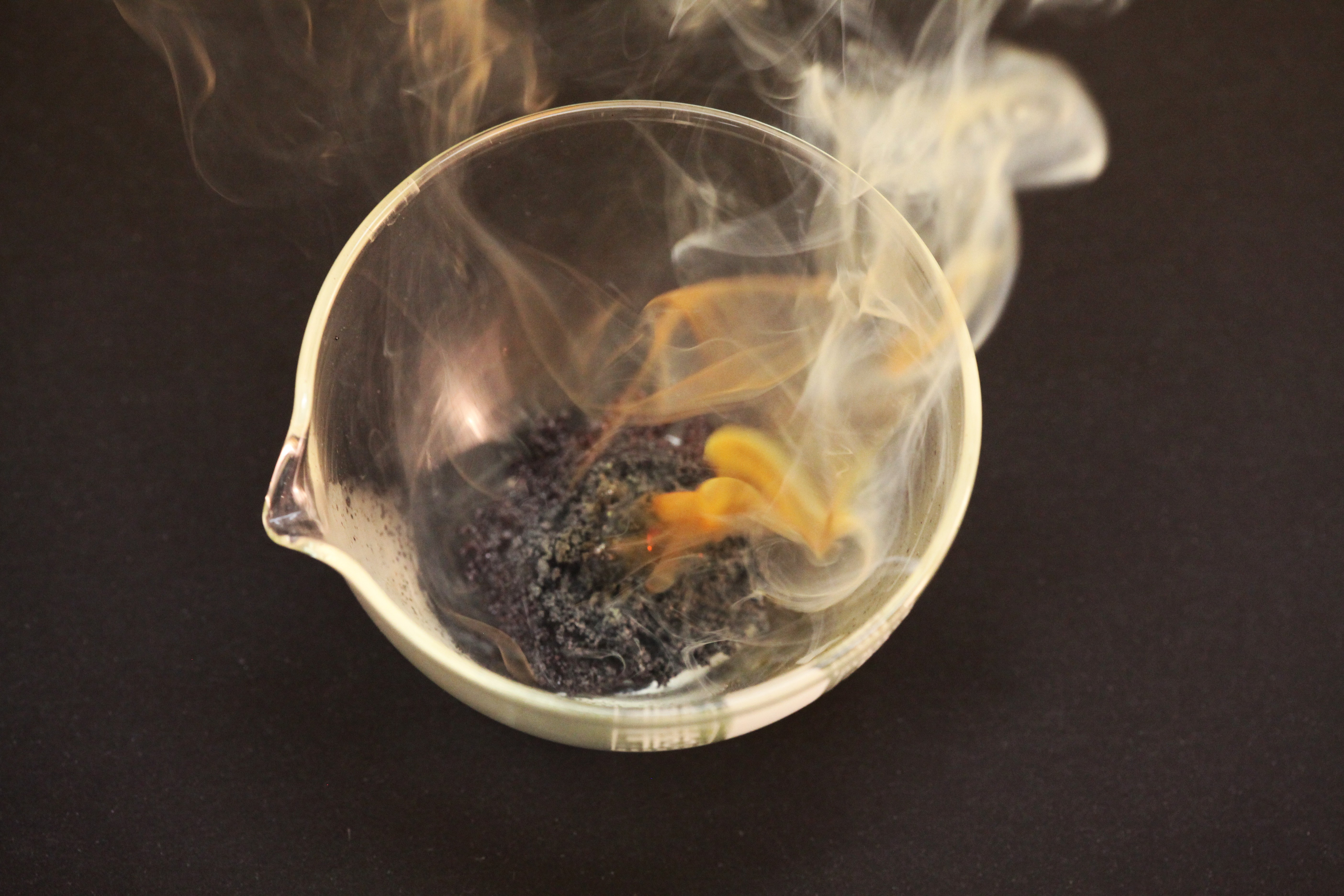
