= Oppenauer oxidation =

Organic redox reaction in chemistry

Named after	Rupert Viktor Oppenauer
Reaction type	Organic redox reaction

Identifiers
Organic Chemistry Portal	oppenauer-oxidation
RSC ontology ID	RXNO:0000047

Oppenauer oxidation, named after Rupert Viktor Oppenauer, is a gentle method for selectively oxidizing secondary alcohols to ketones.

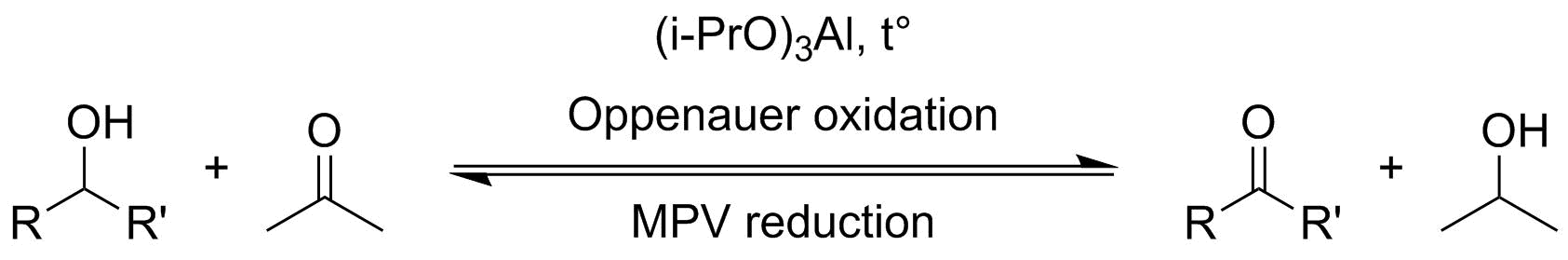
Oppenauer oxidation reaction scheme

The reaction is the opposite Meerwein–Ponndorf–Verley reduction. The alcohol is oxidized with aluminium isopropoxide in excess acetone. This shifts the equilibrium toward the product side.

The oxidation is highly selective for secondary alcohols and does not oxidize other sensitive functional groups such as amines and sulfides. Though primary alcohols can be oxidized under Oppenauer conditions, primary alcohols are seldom oxidized by this method due to the competing aldol condensation of aldehyde products. The Oppenauer oxidation is still used for the oxidation of acid labile substrates. The method has been largely displaced by oxidation methods based on chromates (e.g. pyridinium chlorochromate) or dimethyl sulfoxide (e.g. Swern oxidation) or Dess–Martin oxidation due to its use of relatively mild and non-toxic reagents (e.g. the reaction is run in acetone/benzene mixtures). The Oppenauer oxidation is commonly used in various industrial processes such as the synthesis of steroids, hormones, alkaloids, terpenes, etc.

== Mechanism ==
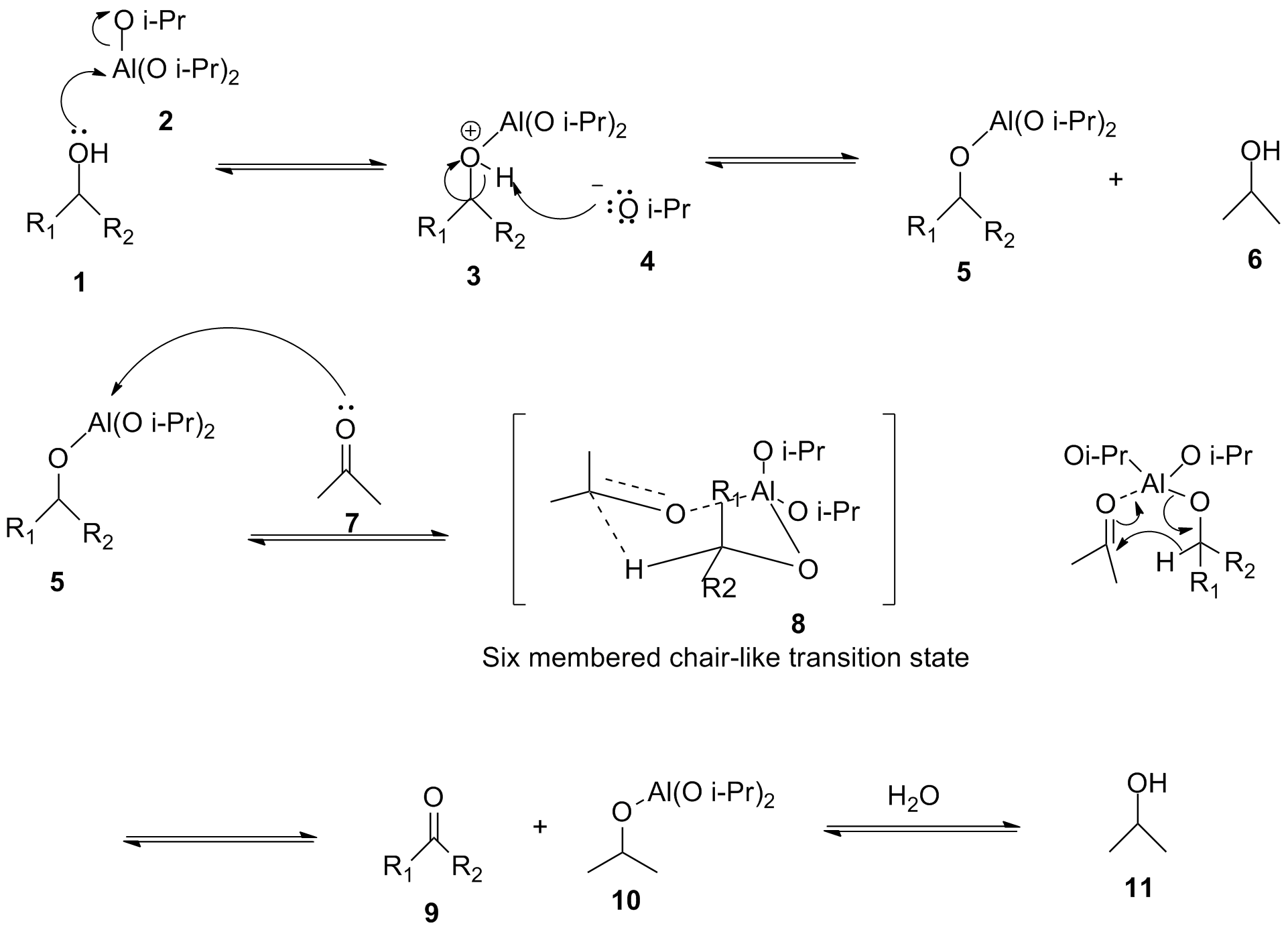
Oppenauer oxidation mechanism

In the first step of this mechanism, the alcohol (1) coordinates to the aluminium to form a complex (3), which then, in the second step, gets deprotonated by an alkoxide ion (4) to generate an alkoxide intermediate (5). In the third step, both the oxidant acetone (7) and the substrate alcohol are bound to the aluminium. The acetone is coordinated to the aluminium which activates it for the hydride transfer from the alkoxide. The aluminium-catalyzed hydride shift from the α-carbon of the alcohol to the carbonyl carbon of acetone proceeds over a six-membered transition state (8). The desired ketone (9) is formed after the hydride transfer.

== Advantages ==
An advantage of the Oppenauer oxidation is its use of relatively inexpensive and non-toxic reagents. Reaction conditions are mild and gentle since the substrates are generally heated in acetone/benzene mixtures. Another advantage of the Oppenauer oxidation which makes it unique to other oxidation methods such as pyridinium chlorochromate (PCC) and Dess–Martin periodinane is that secondary alcohols are oxidized much faster than primary alcohols, thus chemoselectivity can be achieved. Furthermore, there is no over oxidation of aldehydes to carboxylic acids as opposed to another oxidation methods such the Jones oxidation.

== Modifications ==
=== Wettstein-Oppenauer reaction ===
In the Wettstein-Oppenauer reaction, discovered by Wettstein in 1945, Δ 5–3β-hydroxy steroids are oxidized to Δ 4,6-3-ketosteroids with benzoquinone as the hydrogen acceptor. This reaction is useful in that it affords a one-step preparation of Δ 4,6-3-ketosteroids.

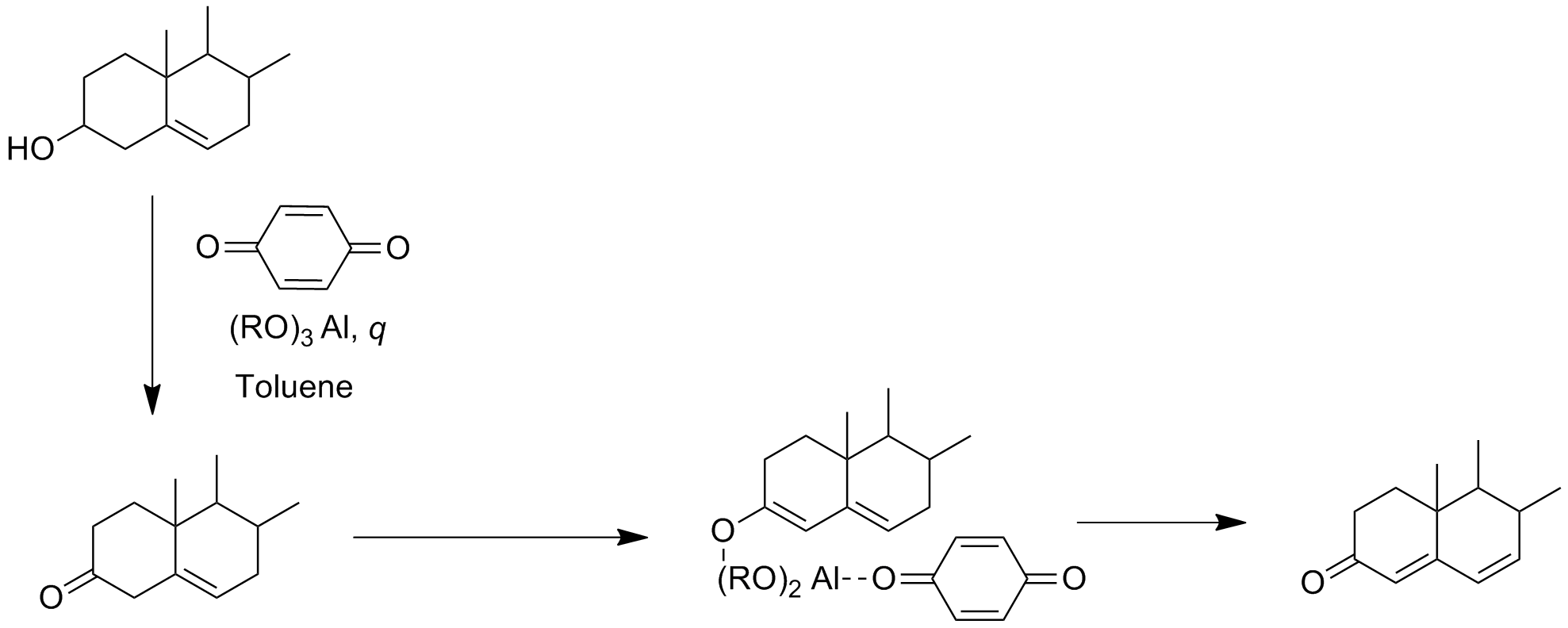
Wettstein-Oppenauer reaction

=== Woodward modification ===
In the Woodward modification, Woodward substituted potassium tert-butoxide for the aluminium alkoxide. The Woodward modification of the Oppenauer oxidation, also called the Oppenauer–Woodward oxidation, is used when certain alcohol groups do not oxidize under the standard Oppenauer reaction conditions. For example, Woodward used potassium tert-butoxide and benzophenone for the oxidation of quinine to quininone, as the traditional aluminium catalytic system failed to oxidize quinine due to the complex formed by coordination of the Lewis-basic nitrogen to the aluminium centre.

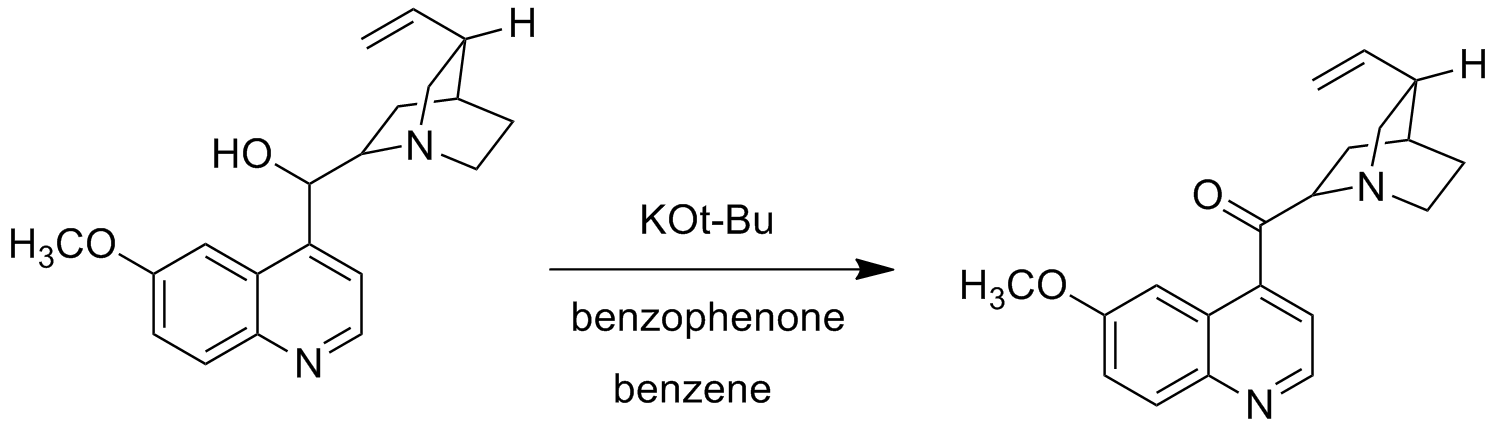
Woodward modication

=== Other modifications ===
Several modified aluminium alkoxide catalysts have been also reported. For example, a highly active aluminium catalyst was reported by Maruoka and co-workers which was utilized in the oxidation of carveol to carvone (a member of a family of chemicals called terpenoids) in excellent yield (94%).

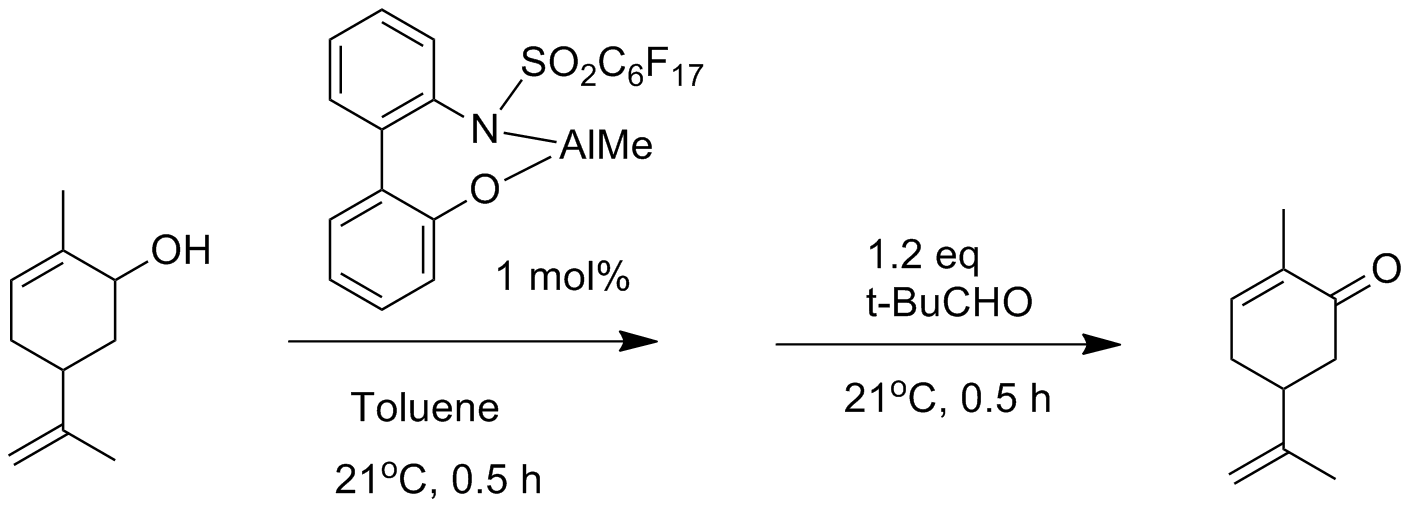
An Oppenauer oxidation modication

In another modification the catalyst is trimethylaluminium and the aldehyde 3-nitrobenzaldehyde is used as the oxidant, for example, in the oxidation of isoborneol to camphor.

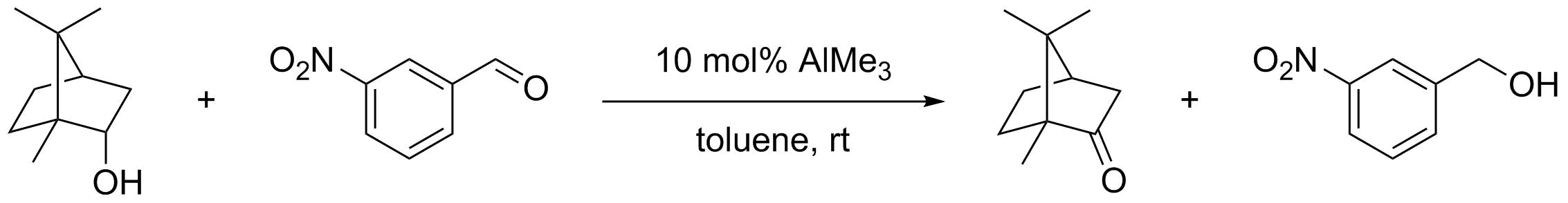
An Oppenauer oxidation modification

== Synthetic applications ==
The Oppenauer oxidation is used to prepare analgesics in the pharmaceutical industry such as morphine and codeine. For instance, codeinone is prepared by the Oppenauer oxidation of codeine.

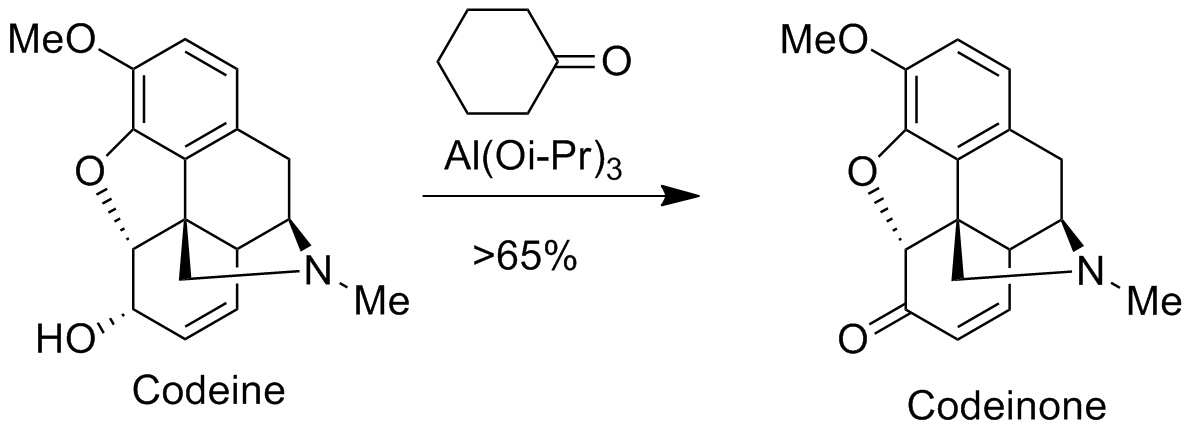
An Oppenauer oxidation of codeine

The Oppenauer oxidation is also used to synthesize hormones. Progesterone is prepared by the Oppenauer oxidation of pregnenolone.

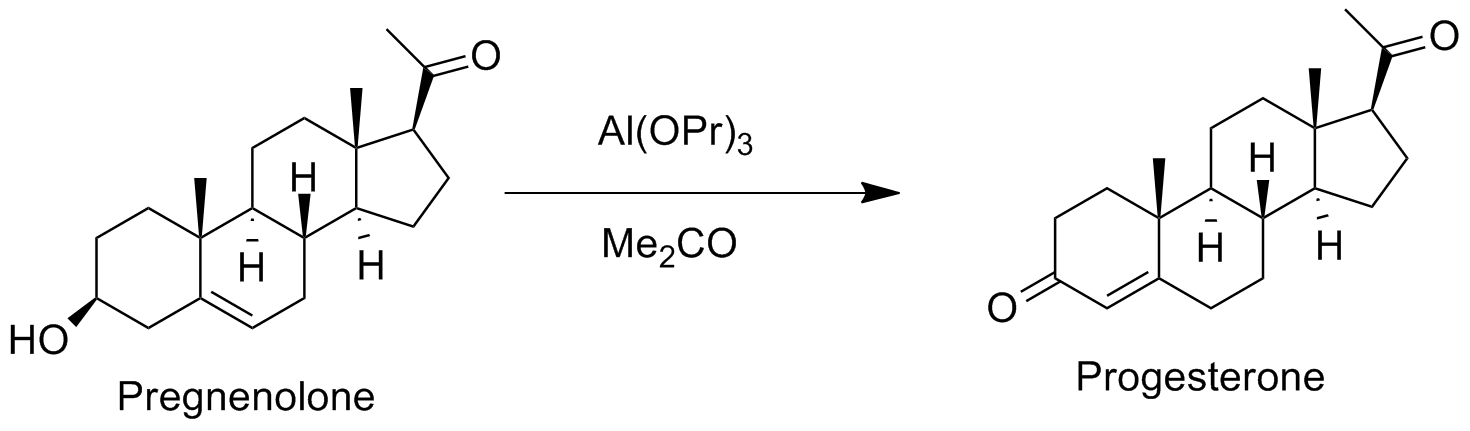
An Oppenauer oxidation of pregnenolone

A slight variation of the Oppenauer oxidation is also used to synthesize steroid derivatives. For example, an efficient catalytic version of the Oppenauer oxidation which employs a ruthenium catalyst has been developed for the oxidation of 5-unsaturated 3β-hydroxy steroids to the corresponding 4-en-3-one derivative.

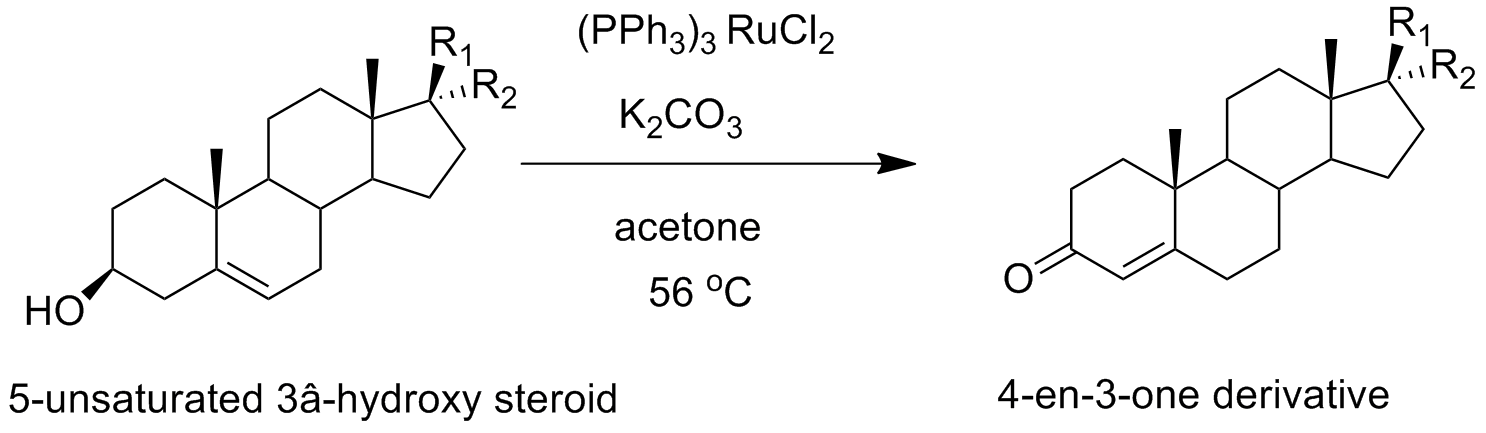
An Oppenauer oxidation of pregnenolone

The Oppenauer oxidation is also used in the synthesis of lactones from 1,4 and 1,5 diols.

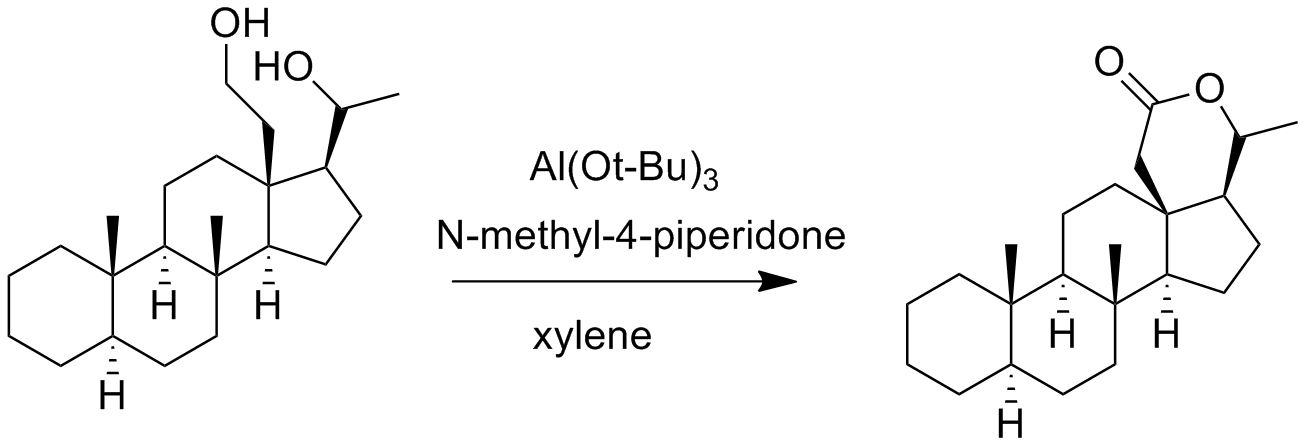
An Oppenauer oxidation of diol

== Side reactions ==
A common side-reaction of the Oppenauer oxidation is the base-catalyzed aldol condensation of aldehyde product, which have α-hydrogens to form either β-hydroxy aldehydes or α, ß-unsaturated aldehydes.

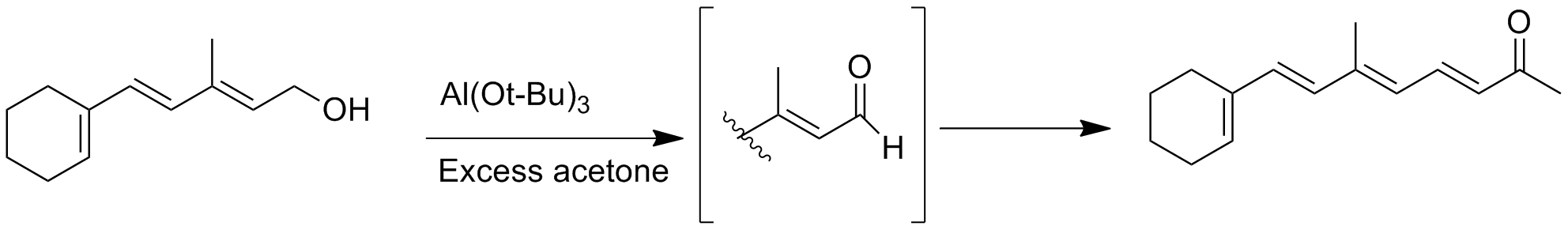
An Oppenauer oxidation of aldehyde

Another side reaction is the Tischenko reaction of aldehyde products with no α-hydrogen, but this can be prevented by use of anhydrous solvents. Another general side reaction is the migration of the double bond during the oxidation of allylic alcohol substrates.

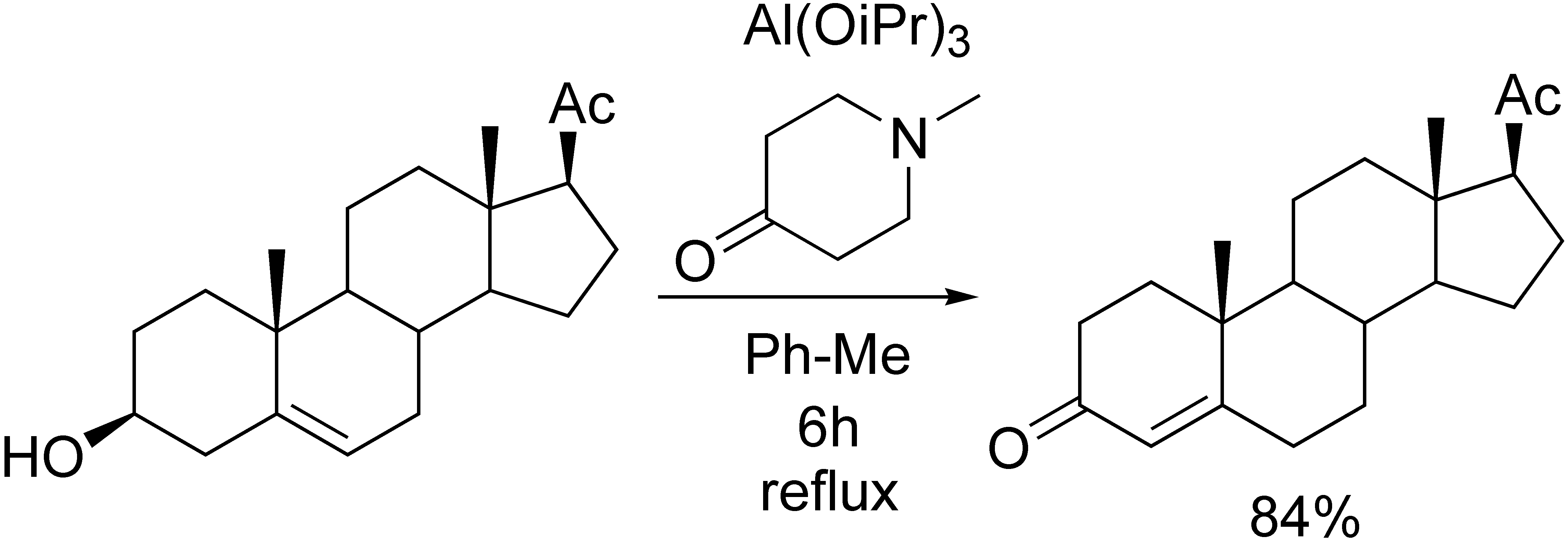
Oppenauer oxidation of a steroid derivative.

== See also ==
- Alcohol oxidation
- Pyridinium chlorochromate
- Jones oxidation
- Pfitzner–Moffatt oxidation
- Parikh–Doering oxidation
- Albright–Goldman oxidation
- Swern oxidation
- Corey–Kim oxidation
- Dess–Martin periodinane oxidation
- Ley oxidation (TPAP oxidation)
- TEMPO oxidation
