= N-tert-Butylbenzenesulfinimidoyl chloride =

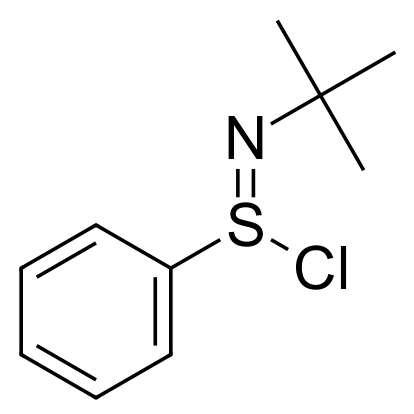
- Line drawing of N-tert-butylbenzenesulfinimidoyl chloride

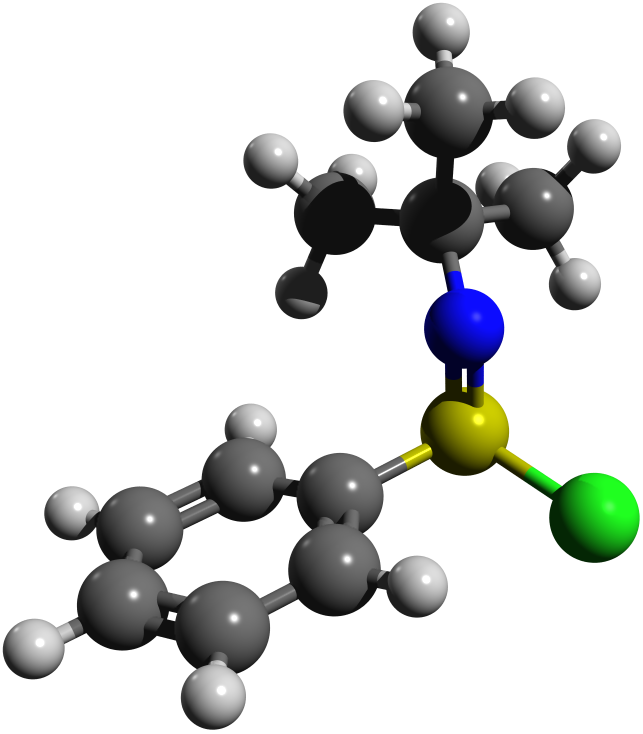
Ball-and-stick model of N-tert-butylbenzenesulfinimidoyl chloride
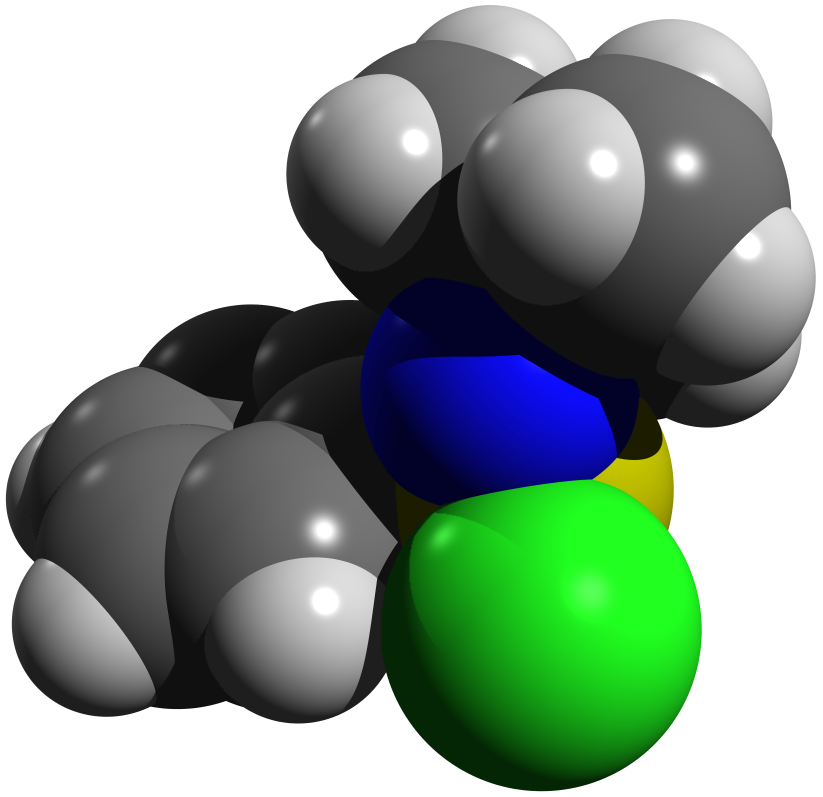
Space-filling model of N-tert-butylbenzenesulfinimidoyl chloride

Names
- Preferred IUPAC name N-tert-Butylbenzenesulfinimidoyl chloride
- Systematic IUPAC name [(1,1-Dimethylethyl)imino]chloro(phenyl)-λ^{4}-sulfane
- Other names N-tert-Butylphenylsulfinimidoyl chloride

Identifiers
CAS Number	49591-20-0
3D model (JSmol)	Interactive image
ChemSpider	9542820
ECHA InfoCard	100.189.718
PubChem CID	11367903
UNII	JZE5325ZY8
UN number	3261
CompTox Dashboard (EPA)	DTXSID00463732
- InChI: InChI=1S/C10H14ClNS/c1-10(2,3)12-13(11)9-7-5-4-6-8-9/h4-8H,1-3H3
- SMILES: CC(C)(C)N=S(C1=CC=CC=C1)Cl

Properties
Chemical formula	C_{10}H_{14}ClNS
Molar mass	215.74 g·mol^{−1}
Appearance	Yellow to deep yellow-red crystals or powder
Melting point	51 to 53 °C (124 to 127 °F; 324 to 326 K)
Boiling point	112 to 116 °C (234 to 241 °F; 385 to 389 K) 0.5 mm Hg
Solubility in water	Decomposes
Solubility in other solvents	Benzene, THF, DCM; slightly soluble in toluene

Hazards
- Occupational safety and health (OHS/OSH)
Main hazards	Corrosive
- GHS labelling
Pictograms	(GHS05: Corrosive)
Signal word	Danger
Hazard statements	H290, H314
Precautionary statements	P234, P260, P264, P280, P301+P330+P331, P303+P361+P353, P304+P340, P305+P351+P338, P310, P363, P405
- Except where otherwise noted, data are given for materials in their standard state (at 25 °C [77 °F], 100 kPa). Infobox references

N-tert-Butylbenzenesulfinimidoyl chloride is a useful oxidant for organic synthesis reactions. It is a good electrophile, and the sulfimide S=N bond can be attacked by nucleophiles, such as alkoxides, enolates, and amide ions. The nitrogen atom in the resulting intermediate is basic, and can abstract an α-hydrogen to create a new double bond.

== Preparation ==
This reagent can be synthesized quickly and in near-quantitative yield by reacting phenyl thioacetate with tert-butyldichloroamine in hot benzene. After the reaction is complete, the product can be isolated as a yellow, moisture-sensitive solid by vacuum distillation.

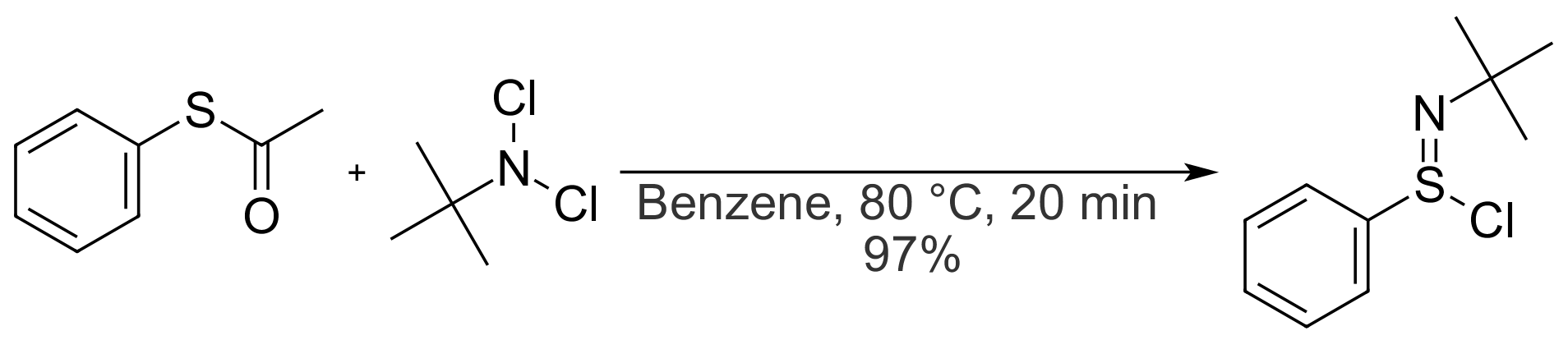

== Mechanism ==
A nucleophile, such as an alkoxide (1), attacks the S=N bond in 2. The resulting intermediate (3) collapses and ejects chloride ion, which is a good leaving group. The resulting sulfimide has two resonance forms - 4a and 4b. Because of this, the nitrogen is basic, and via a five-membered ring transition state, it can abstract the hydrogen adjacent to the oxygen. This forms a new C=O bond and ejects a neutral sulfenamide (5), giving ketone 6 as the product. N-tert-Butylbenzenesulfinimidoyl chloride reacts with enolates, amides, and primary alkoxides by the same general mechanism.

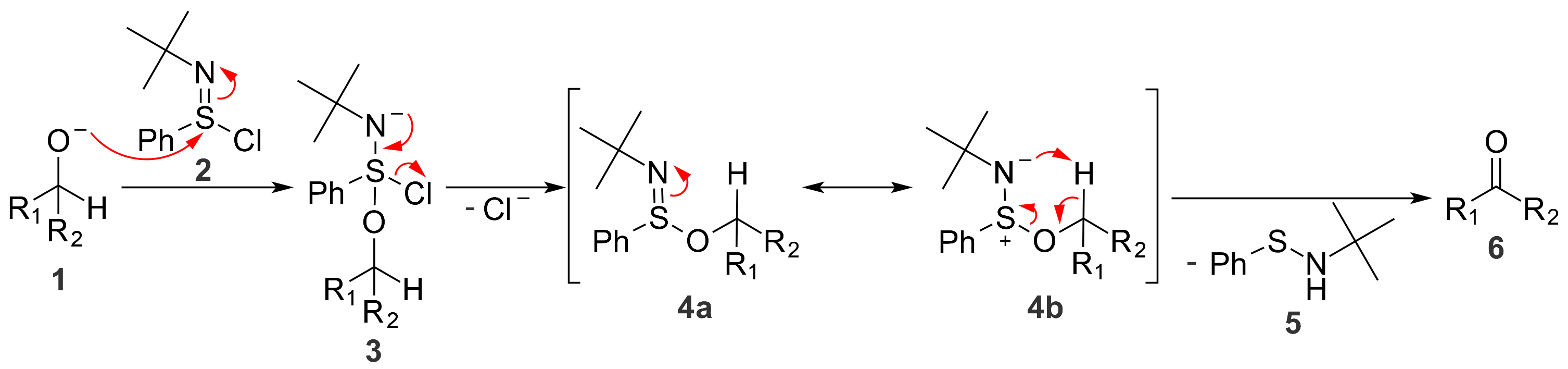

The Swern oxidation, which converts primary and secondary alcohols to aldehydes and ketones, respectively, also uses a sulfur-containing compound (DMSO) as the oxidant and proceeds by a similar mechanism. In the Swern oxidation, elimination also occurs via a five-membered ring transition state, but the basic species is a sulfur ylide instead of a negatively charged nitrogen. Several other oxidation reactions also make use of DMSO as the oxidant and pass through a similar transition state (see #See also).

== Reactions ==
Reacting an aldehyde with a Grignard reagent or organolithium and treating the resulting secondary alkoxide with N-tert-butylbenzenesulfinimidoyl chloride is a convenient one-pot reaction for converting aldehydes to ketones. In some cases, an equivalent of DMPU, a Lewis base, will increase yields. For example, treating benzaldehyde with n-butyllithium and N-tert-butylbenzenesulfinimidoyl chloride in THF gives 1-phenyl-1-pentanone in good yield.

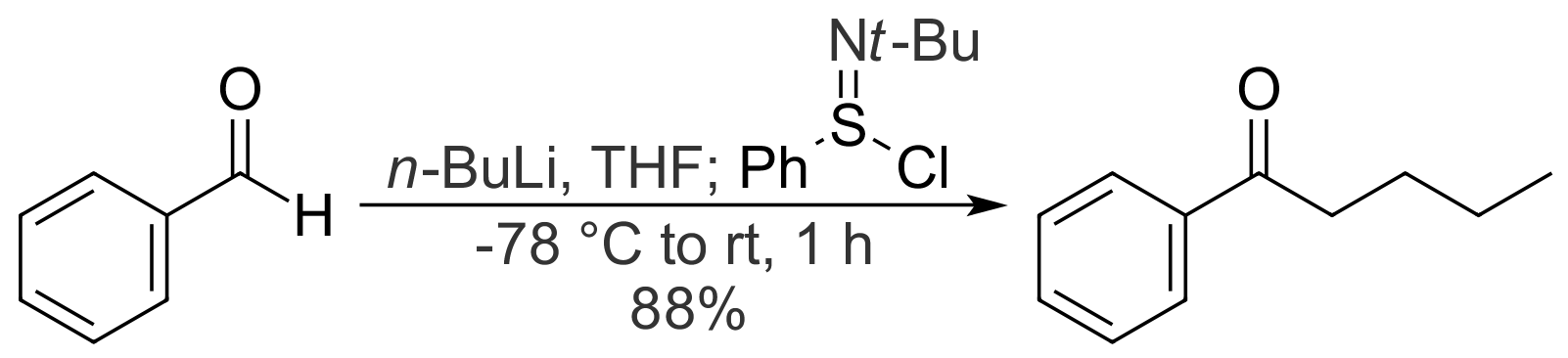

N-tert-butyl benzenesulfinimidoyl chloride oxidizes enolates to enones or enals.

N-tert-Butylbenzenesulfinimidoyl chloride can also be used to synthesize imines from amines. Imines synthesized in this fashion have been shown to undergo a one-pot Mannich reaction with 1,3-dicarbonyl compounds, such as malonate esters and 1,3-diketones. In this example, Cbz-protected benzylamine is deprotonated using n-butyllithium, then treated with N-tert-butylbenzenesulfinimidoyl chloride to form the protected imine. Dimethyl malonate acts as the nucleophile and reacts with the imine to give the final product, a Mannich base.

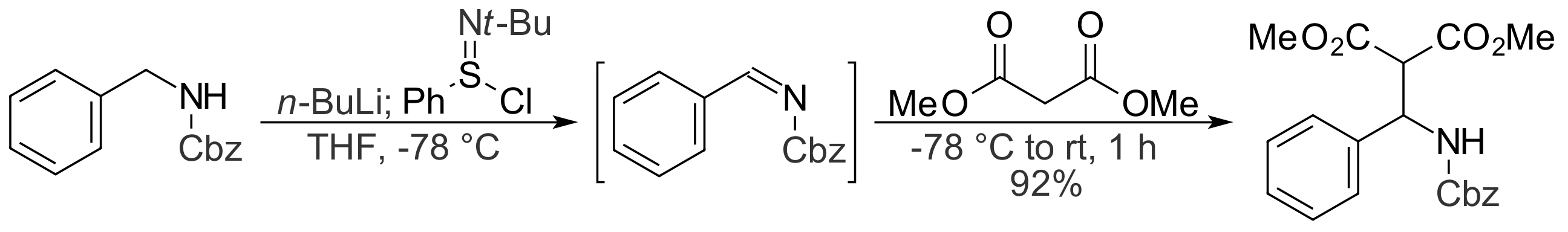

== See also ==
- Swern oxidation
- Pfitzner–Moffatt oxidation
- Corey–Kim oxidation
- Parikh–Doering oxidation
