= Sulfonium-based oxidation of alcohols to aldehydes =

Group of organic reactions

Sulfonium-based oxidations of alcohols to aldehydes summarizes a group of organic reactions that transform a primary alcohol to the corresponding aldehyde (and a secondary alcohol to the corresponding ketone). Selective oxidation of alcohols to aldehydes requires circumventing over-oxidation to the carboxylic acid. One popular approach are methods that proceed through intermediate alkoxysulfonium species (RO−SMe^{+}_{2}X-, e.g. compound 6) as detailed here. Since most of these methods employ dimethyl sulfoxide (DMSO) as oxidant and generate dimethyl sulfide, these are often colloquially summarized as DMSO-oxidations. Conceptually, generating an aldehyde and dimethyl sulfide from an alcohol and DMSO requires a dehydrating agent for removal of H_{2}O, ideally an electrophile simultaneously activating DMSO. In contrast, methods generating the sulfonium intermediate from dimethyl sulfide do not require a dehydrating agent. Closely related are oxidations mediated by dimethyl selenoxide and by dimethyl selenide.

== Comparison with related methods ==
In comparisons, sulfonium-based methods are popular because reactions are efficient (high yields, comparably fast, no over-oxidation, few side reactions, reproducible results), reaction conditions are mild (low temperature, no strong acids or bases), reactions are operationally simple (no specialized equipment or uncommon and/or costly reagents necessary, byproducts often easily separated, tolerant of oxygen and moisture,) and they generally avoid highly toxic starting materials and toxic waste disposal. However, the reactions are not too popular with many undergraduate chemistry students in the laboratory since the common byproduct dimethyl sulfide is a strong odorant, reminiscent of fouling eggs, that requires a well-ventilated fume hood. Other drawbacks might include excess of base, handling of the dehydrating agent, limited choice of solvent or side reactions at elevated temperature, e.g. Pummerer rearrangement or elimination of the sulfonium intermediate to the reactive H_{2}C=(S+)-CH_{3}-species that form methylthiomethyl ethers with alcohols. In consequence this means that the activity of the oxidation can not be tuned at will by increasing the reaction temperature, e.g. to force oxidation of an unreactive alcohol.

Common alternatives to these sulfonium-based methods are oxidations with

- hypervalent iodine (e.g., Dess–Martin periodinane, 2-iodoxybenzoic acid)
- chromium reagents (e.g., pyridinium chlorochromate, Collins reagent)
- ruthenium oxides (e.g., tetrapropylammonium perruthenate)
- oxoammonium species (e.g., TEMPO)
- transfer hydrogenation or hydride transfer (e.g., Oppenauer oxidation)
- MnO_{2}, barium manganate, 2,3-Dichloro-5,6-dicyano-1,4-benzoquinone for allylic alcohols

== Categories ==
The sulfonium oxidations can be categorized into two groups: The methods discovered earliest rely on activated alcohols like alkyl tosylates (Kornblum oxidation) or alkyl chloroformates (from reaction of alcohols with phosgene: Barton-Kornblum) that react as electrophiles when treated with DMSO, liberating an oxygenated leaving group (e.g. OTs−). However, the additional step for pre-activation of the alcohol and sometimes harsh reaction conditions for the nucleophilic displacement proved less convenient. Therefore, methods generating activated sulfoxides have been developed later. Depicted below is the activated sulfoxide generated during Swern oxidation 4 reacting with a secondary alcohol 5 to form alkoxysulfonium species 6.

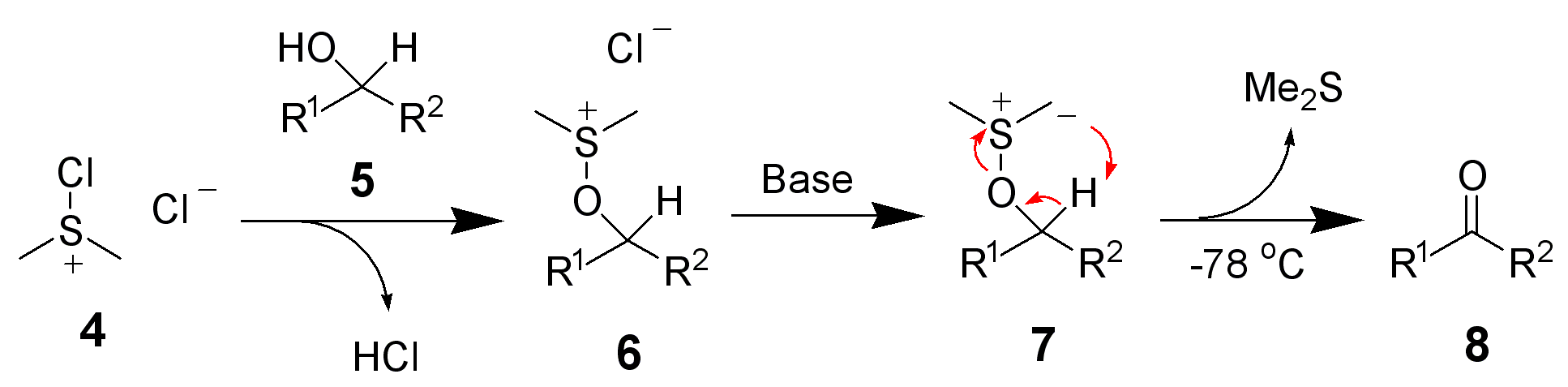
The mechanism of the Swern oxidation.

These activated sulfoxides react as electrophiles when treated with an alcohol, expelling a leaving group that might simultaneously function as counter-ion to the alkoxysulfonium species (RO−SMe^{+}_{2}) generated. Upon deprotonation – usually assisted by a mild base like triethylamine – the alkoxysulfonium species decomposes, yielding the aldehyde and dimethyl sulfide. The latter collection contains popular oxidations like

- Swern,
- Corey–Kim,
- Parikh–Doering,
- Pfitzner–Moffatt

and also includes Albright–Goldman, Albright–Onodera (DMSO/P_{2}O_{5}), TFAA/DMSO (Swern) and Me_{2}S/Cl_{2}. Recently, SO_{2}F_{2} has been proposed for generating the activated sulfoxide from DMSO.

== See also ==
- Alcohol oxidation
- Oxidation with chromium(VI)-amine complexes
- Oxoammonium-catalyzed oxidation
- Dess–Martin oxidation
