= Tetrapropylammonium =

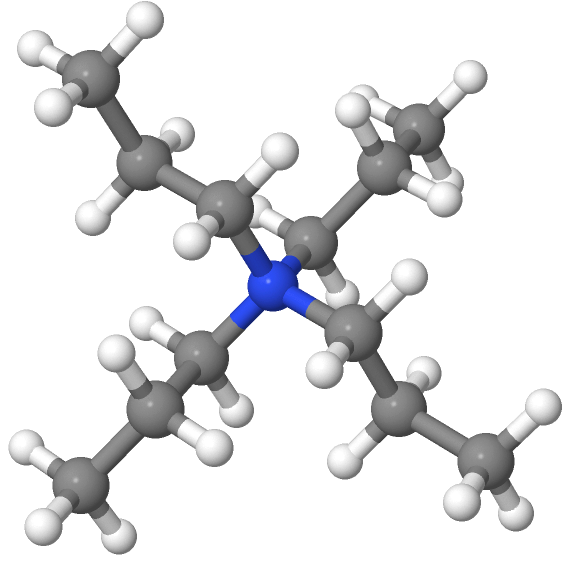

Names
- IUPAC name N,N,N-Tripropylpropan-1-aminium
- Other names Tetrapropylammonium; Tetrapropylazanium; Tetra-n-propylammonium; TPA

Identifiers
CAS Number	13010-31-6
3D model (JSmol)	Interactive image
Beilstein Reference	1748523
ChEBI	CHEBI:55319
ChEMBL	ChEMBL2074857
ChemSpider	9184
PubChem CID	9559
CompTox Dashboard (EPA)	DTXSID6047026
- InChI: InChI=1S/C12H28N/c1-5-9-13(10-6-2,11-7-3)12-8-4/h5-12H2,1-4H3/q+1 Key: OSBSFAARYOCBHB-UHFFFAOYSA-N
- SMILES: [N+](CCC)(CCC)(CCC)CCC

Properties
Chemical formula	C_{12}H_{28}N^{+}
Molar mass	186.362 g·mol^{−1}

Structure
Molecular shape	Tetrahedral

Related compounds
Other cations	Tetramethylammonium [N(CH_{3})]^{+}_{4}; Tetraethylammonium [N(C_{2}H_{5})_{4}]^{+}; Tetrabutylammonium [N(C_{4}H_{9})_{4}]^{+}
Related compounds	Trimethylamine N(C_{3}H_{7})_{3}; Tetrapropylammonium perruthenate N(C_{3}H_{7})_{4}RuO_{4}
- Except where otherwise noted, data are given for materials in their standard state (at 25 °C [77 °F], 100 kPa). Infobox references

Tetrapropylammonium (TPA) is a quaternary ammonium cation with the formula [N(C_{3}H_{7})_{4}]^{+}, also denoted [NPr_{4}]^{+} (where Pr = propyl group). It is a precursor to several significant industrial and laboratory catalysts.

== Properties ==
TPA is chemically similar to other quaternary ammonium cations with saturated alkyl groups. As such, it is highly electrochemically stable, degrading only in the presence of particularly strong bases and nucleophiles.

It is isoelectronic with tetrapropyltin and the tetrapropylborate anion.

== Synthesis ==
Like other quaternary ammonium cations, TPA is prepared by the alkylation of the corresponding ammonia analogue, tripropylamine. Treatment of the amine with a primary propyl halide such as n-bromopropane yields the corresponding TPA halide salt in a Menshutkin reaction:

(C_{3}H_{7})_{3}N + C_{3}H_{7}Br → (C_{3}H_{7})_{4}N^{+}Br^{−}

The halide salts are then converted to the more industrially valuable hydroxide by reaction with aqueous silver oxide, electrolysis, ion-exchange resin, or electrodialysis.

== Applications ==
The tetrapropylammonium cation is used as a structure-directing agent in the production of synthetic zeolites, in particular ZSM-5 and titanium-bearing TS-1 catalysts. After synthesis, TPA is removed by thermolysis.

The TPA salt tetrapropylammonium perruthenate (TPAP) is an effective and highly selective oxidiser, with numerous applications in organic synthesis. Combined with a cooxidant, it serves as a catalyst for the oxidation of primary and secondary alcohols to aldehydes and ketones.
