= 3-Hexanone =

Names
- Preferred IUPAC name Hexan-3-one
- Other names Ethyl propyl ketone

Identifiers
CAS Number	589-38-8
3D model (JSmol)	Interactive image
ChEBI	CHEBI:89891
ChemSpider	11025
ECHA InfoCard	100.008.770
PubChem CID	11509
UNII	P601A79G79
CompTox Dashboard (EPA)	DTXSID2021608
- InChI: InChI=1S/C6H12O/c1-3-5-6(7)4-2/h3-5H2,1-2H3 Key: PFCHFHIRKBAQGU-UHFFFAOYSA-N; InChI=1/C6H12O/c1-3-5-6(7)4-2/h3-5H2,1-2H3 Key: PFCHFHIRKBAQGU-UHFFFAOYAM
- SMILES: O=C(CC)CCC

Properties
Chemical formula	C_{6}H_{12}O
Molar mass	100.161 g·mol^{−1}
Appearance	Colorless liquid
Density	0.82 g/cm^{3}
Melting point	−55.5 °C (−67.9 °F; 217.7 K)
Boiling point	123 °C (253 °F; 396 K)
Solubility in water	14.7 g/L
Vapor pressure	13.9 mmHg
Magnetic susceptibility (χ)	−69.03·10^{−6} cm^{3}/mol
Refractive index (n_{D})	1.4

Hazards
Flash point	20 °C (68 °F; 293 K)
- Lethal dose or concentration (LD, LC)
LD_{50} (median dose)	2740 mg/kg (oral rat); 2580 mg/kg (dermal, rabbit)
- Except where otherwise noted, data are given for materials in their standard state (at 25 °C [77 °F], 100 kPa). Infobox references

3-Hexanone (ethyl propyl ketone) is an organic compound with the formula C_{6}H_{12}O. It is a ketone used as a solvent and as a chemical intermediate. It is highly flammable. It has roles as a human urinary metabolite, a human xenobiotic metabolite, an insect trap, a plant metabolite and a bacterial xenobiotic metabolite. It derives from a hydride of hexane.

According to IFF, it was described as having sweet, fruity, waxy, grape organoleptic properties.

== Preparation ==
3-Hexanone can be obtained by oxidation of 3-hexanol:

It is also the product of the Grignard reaction of propylmagnesium bromide with propionitrile:

== Health effects ==
3-Hexanone can also act as a neurotoxin, causing chronic solvent-induced encephalopathy. Patients with this disease can experience difficulty sleeping, a decrease in intellectual capacity, dizziness, altered visual perception, impaired psychomotor skills, forgetfulness, and disorientation. Neurological signs include impaired vibratory sensation at extremities and an inability to maintain steady motion.

== Isomers ==
- 2-Methyl-3-pentanone (Ethyl isopropyl ketone)
