= Swern oxidation =

Organic redox reaction

Named after	Daniel Swern
Reaction type	Organic redox reaction

Identifiers
Organic Chemistry Portal	swern-oxidation
RSC ontology ID	RXNO:0000154
- (what is this?) (verify)

In organic chemistry, the Swern oxidation also known as Moffatt–Swern, named after Daniel Swern, is a chemical reaction whereby a primary or secondary alcohol (−OH) is oxidized to an aldehyde (−CH=O) or ketone (>C=O) using oxalyl chloride, dimethyl sulfoxide (DMSO) and an organic base, such as triethylamine. It is one of the many oxidation reactions commonly referred to as 'activated DMSO' oxidations. The reaction is known for its mild character and wide tolerance of functional groups.

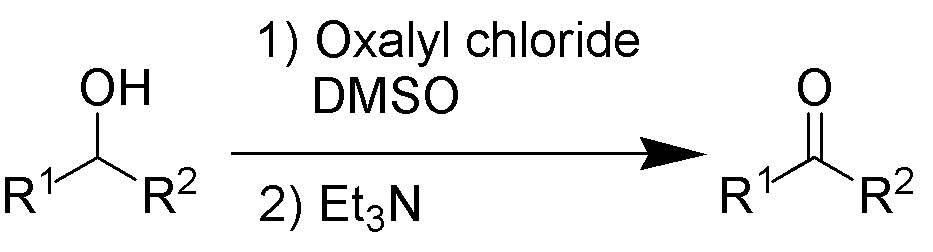
The Swern oxidation.

The by-products are dimethyl sulfide ((CH_{3})_{2}S), carbon monoxide (CO), carbon dioxide (CO_{2}) and—when triethylamine is used as base—triethylammonium chloride (Et_{3}NHCl). Of the volatile by-products, dimethyl sulfide has a strong, pervasive odour and carbon monoxide is acutely toxic, so the reaction and the work-up needs to be performed in a fume hood. Dimethyl sulfide is a volatile liquid (B.P. 99 °F (37 °C)) with an unpleasant odour at even low concentrations.

== Mechanism ==
The first step of the Swern oxidation is the low-temperature reaction of DMSO, 1a, formally as resonance contributor 1b, with oxalyl chloride, 2. The first intermediate, 3, quickly decomposes giving off carbon dioxide and carbon monoxide and producing chloro(dimethyl)sulfonium chloride, 4.

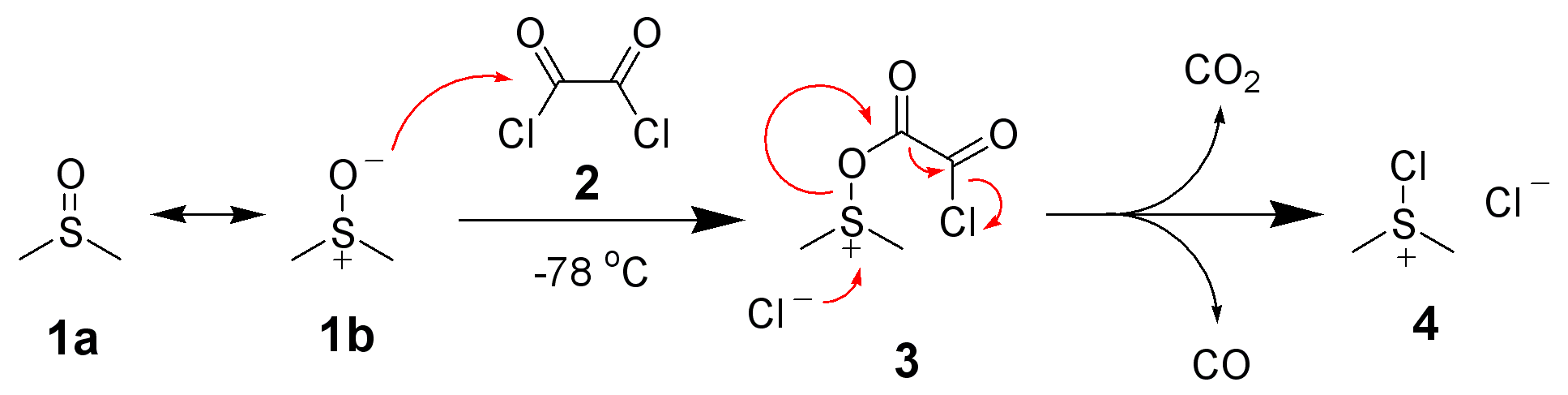
Dimethylchlorosulfonium chloride formation.

After addition of the alcohol 5, the chloro(dimethyl)sulfonium chloride 4 reacts with the alcohol to give the key alkoxysulfonium ion intermediate, 6. The addition of at least 2 equivalents of base — typically triethylamine — will deprotonate the alkoxysulfonium ion to give the sulfur ylide 7. In a five-membered ring transition state, the sulfur ylide 7 decomposes to give dimethyl sulfide and the desired carbonyl compound 8.

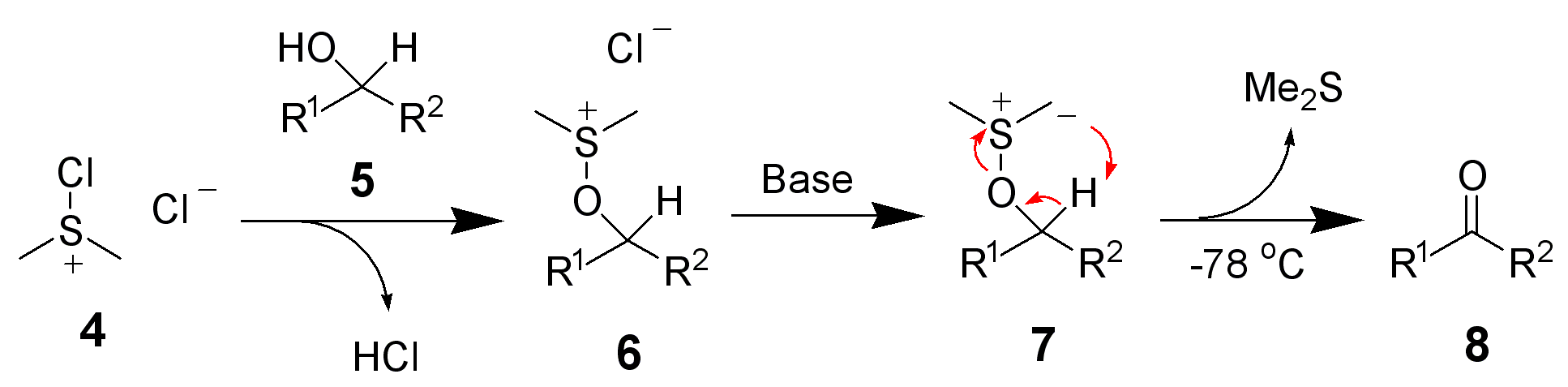
The mechanism of the Swern oxidation.

== Variations ==
When using oxalyl chloride as the dehydration agent, the reaction must be kept colder than −76 °F (−60 °C) to avoid side reactions. With cyanuric chloride or trifluoroacetic anhydride instead of oxalyl chloride, the reaction can be warmed to −22 °F (−30 °C) without side reactions. Other methods for the activation of DMSO to initiate the formation of the key intermediate 6 are the use of carbodiimides (Pfitzner–Moffatt oxidation), a sulfur trioxide pyridine complex (Parikh–Doering oxidation) or acetic anhydride (Albright-Goldman oxidation). The intermediate 4 can also be prepared from dimethyl sulfide and N-chlorosuccinimide (the Corey–Kim oxidation).

In some cases, the use of triethylamine as the base can lead to epimerisation at the carbon alpha to the newly formed carbonyl. Using a bulkier base, such as diisopropylethylamine, can mitigate this side reaction.

== Considerations ==
Dimethyl sulfide, a byproduct of the Swern oxidation, is one of the most notoriously unpleasant odors known in organic chemistry. Humans can detect this compound in concentrations as low as 0.02 to 0.1 parts per million. A simple remedy for this problem is to rinse used glassware with bleach or oxone solution, which will oxidize the dimethyl sulfide back to dimethyl sulfoxide or to dimethyl sulfone, both of which are odourless and nontoxic.

The reaction conditions allow oxidation of acid-sensitive compounds, which might decompose under the acidic oxidation conditions such as Jones oxidation. For example, in Thompson & Heathcock's synthesis of the sesquiterpene isovelleral, the final step uses the Swern protocol, avoiding rearrangement of the acid-sensitive cyclopropanemethanol moiety.

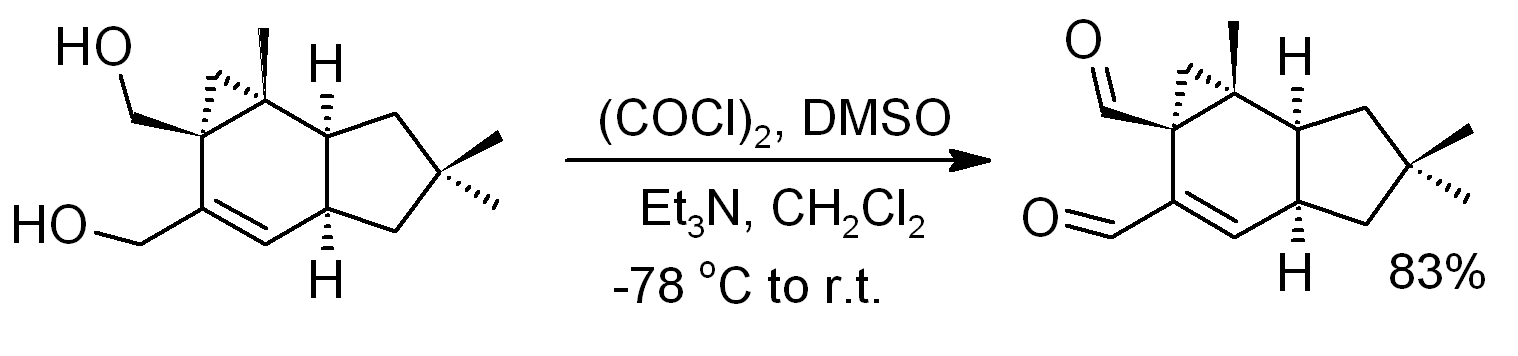

== See also ==
- Alcohol oxidation
- Sulfonium-based oxidation of alcohols to aldehydes
- Pyridinium chlorochromate
- Jones oxidation
- Oppenauer oxidation
- Pfitzner–Moffatt oxidation
- Parikh–Doering oxidation
- Albright-Goldman oxidation
- Corey–Kim oxidation
- Dess–Martin periodinane oxidation
- Ley oxidation (TPAP oxidation)
- TEMPO oxidation
