= Perruthenate =

Identifiers
3D model (JSmol)	Interactive image
- InChI: InChI=1S/4O.Ru/q;;;-1; Key: FXKSCJURPAUPIZ-UHFFFAOYSA-N
- SMILES: [O-][Ru](=O)(=O)=O

Properties
Chemical formula	RuO_{4}^{−}
Molar mass	165.07 g·mol^{−1}

Structure
Molecular shape	Tetrahedral

Related compounds
Other cations	Tetrapropylammonium perruthenate N(C_{3}H_{7})_{4}RuO_{4}
Related compounds	Ruthenium tetroxide RuO_{4}
- Except where otherwise noted, data are given for materials in their standard state (at 25 °C [77 °F], 100 kPa). Infobox references

Perruthenate is an oxyanion of ruthenium in its +7 oxidation state. It is a mild oxidising agent useful in organic synthesis.

== Properties ==
Perruthenate can be considered as the partially reduced derivative of ruthenium tetroxide. It is a much milder oxidising agent than the unionised compound, but still capable of oxidising a number of compounds via its reduction to ruthenate RuO^{2−}_{4}.

== Synthesis ==
Perruthenate can be produced as the sodium or potassium salt by reduction of ruthenium tetroxide with alkaline hydroxide:

4 RuO_{4} + 4 KOH → 4 KRuO_{4} + 2 H_{2}O + O_{2}

Both the concentration and temperature of the reduction must be controlled to avoid further reduction to ruthenate:

4 KRuO_{4} + 4 KOH → 4 K_{2}RuO_{4} + 2 H_{2}O + O_{2}

An alternative route can proceed from the oxidation of ruthenate salts by chlorine gas.

Perruthenate can also be produced in situ by the oxidation of aqueous ruthenium trichloride with sodium bromate; this method produces a dark green solution, which can be precipitated with an appropriate cation to yield the corresponding salt.

== Applications ==
Salts of perruthenate with permanently charged cations are used as catalytic reagents for the oxidation of primary and secondary alcohols to aldehydes and ketones respectively. While the perruthenate anion serves as the oxidising agent in this reaction, rather than a true catalyst, it is quickly restored by an appropriate cooxidant such as N-methylmorpholine N-oxide.

Tetrapropylammonium perruthenate (TPAP) is the most widely used of these reagents, though some alternatives have been proposed which offer greater longevity and temperature stability. Some notable alternate perruthenates are the triphenylphosphine derivatives, such as the salts of isoamyltriphenylphosphonium (ATP3), methyltriphenylphosphonium (MTP3), and tetraphenylphosphonium (TP3).
