= McFadyen–Stevens reaction =

Chemical reaction

The McFadyen–Stevens reaction is a chemical reaction best described as a base-catalyzed thermal decomposition of acylsulfonylhydrazides to aldehydes.

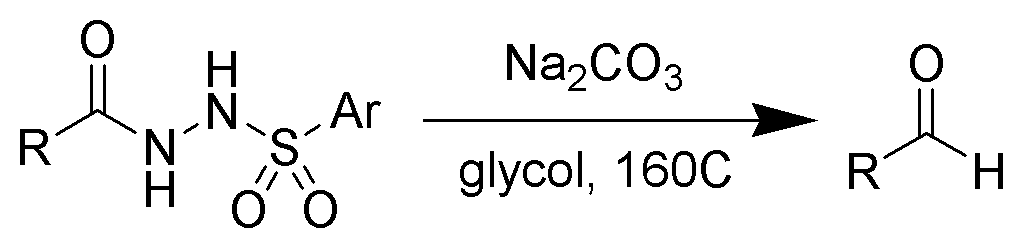
The McFadyen–Stevens reaction

The reaction proceeds well to produce aryl aldehydes, but poorly to produce enolizable aldehydes. Various arylsulfonyl groups have been tried to achieve that reaction.

== Reaction mechanism ==
The mechanism of the McFadyen–Stevens reaction is still under investigation. Two groups have independently proposed a heterolytic fragmentation mechanism. The mechanism involves the deprotonation of the acyl sulfonamide followed by a 1,2-hydride migration to give the alkoxide (3). The collapse of the alkoxide results in the fragmentation producing the desired aldehyde (4), nitrogen gas, and an aryl sulfinate ion (5).

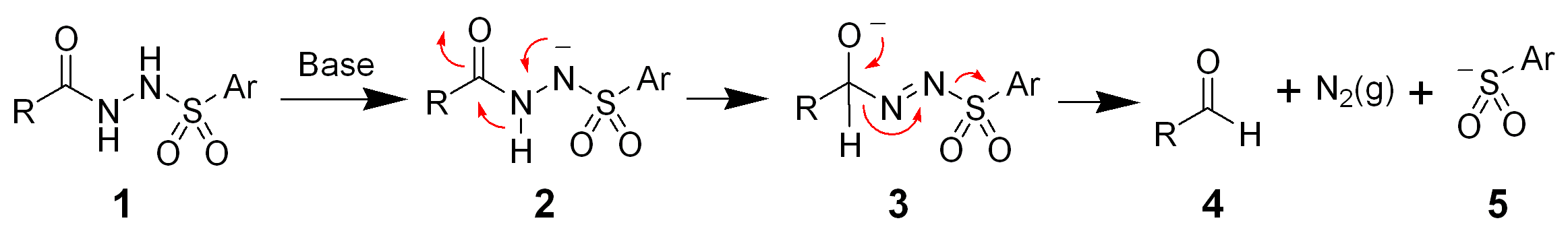
The mechanism of the McFadyen–Stevens reaction

Martin et al. have proposed a different mechanism involving an acyl nitrene.

The reaction is believed catalyzed by a solid surface.

== See also ==
- Hydrazide
