= Sodium tetrapropylborate =

Names
- IUPAC name Sodium tetrapropylboranuide
- Other names Sodium tetrapropylborate Sodium tetra-n-propylborate

Identifiers
CAS Number	105146-61-0
3D model (JSmol)	Interactive image
ChemSpider	21377657
EC Number	808-438-1
MeSH	C489231
PubChem CID	23676209
- InChI: InChI=1S/C12H28B.Na/c1-5-9-13(10-6-2,11-7-3)12-8-4;/h5-12H2,1-4H3;/q-1;+1 Key: VKBNWVIDTHWBAZ-UHFFFAOYSA-N
- SMILES: CCC[B-](CCC)(CCC)CCC.[Na+]

Properties
Chemical formula	(C_{3}H_{7})_{4}BNa
Molar mass	206.16 g·mol^{−1}

Related compounds
Other anions	Sodium tetraphenylborate
- Except where otherwise noted, data are given for materials in their standard state (at 25 °C [77 °F], 100 kPa). Infobox references

Sodium tetrapropylborate is an ionic organoboron compound used as a derivatization reagent for chromatography of organometallic pollutants. It is a white hygroscopic powder. It is stable in aqueous solution, but pyrophoric in air; it can be stored as a solution in tetrahydrofuran for multiple weeks.

== Synthesis ==
Synthesis begins with the propylation of boron trifluoride diethyl etherate with propylmagnesium bromide, yielding tripropylborane:

BF_{3}·(C_{2}H_{5})_{2}O + 3 C_{3}H_{7}MgBr → B(C_{3}H_{7})_{3} + 3 MgBrF + (C_{2}H_{5})_{2}O

Tripropylborane can then react with propylsodium or with 1-chloropropane and sodium metal to yield the tetrapropylborate.

== Applications ==
The tetrapropylboranuide anion is a reagent for the propylation of organometallic compounds, including organotin, organomercury, and organolead compounds of interest to environmental and public health research. As environmental organometallic contaminants often occur as ions, peralkylation is needed to render them volatile for gas chromatography. This reaction can be performed with Grignard reagents such as propylmagnesium bromide, but their reactivity with water greatly complicates the process for environmental samples.

For any organyl(s) R, the reactions of interest for derivatization proceed as follows:

R_{4−n}(Sn,Pb)^{n+} + n NaB(C_{3}H_{7})_{4} ⇌ R_{4−n}(Sn,Pb)(C_{3}H_{7})_{n} + n B(C_{3}H_{7})_{3} + n Na^{+}
RHg^{+} + NaB(C_{3}H_{7})_{4} ⇌ RHgC_{3}H_{7} + B(C_{3}H_{7})_{3} + Na^{+}

As many organometallic pollutants contain methyl, ethyl, or butyl groups, alkylation with any of these groups would render the pollutants indistinguishable from inorganic material present in the sample: triethyl lead is 100 times as toxic as inorganic lead, but after perethylation, both would yield tetraethyllead.

By introducing propyl groups, less common in pollutants of interest, sodium tetrapropylborate allows the analysis of methyl, ethyl, and butyl compounds in a single process.
