= Sulfamation =

Installation of sulfamic acid or sulfamate

In organic chemistry sulfamation is the installation of either of two related functional groups, sulfamic acid (R_{2}NSO_{3}H) and sulfamate (R_{2}NSO_{3}^{−}). Typical methods entail reaction of primary amines with sources of sulfur trioxide such as pyridine-sulfur trioxide:

RNH_{2} + SO_{3} → RNHSO_{3}H

Sulfamation can also be effected by treating the amine with the sulfate ester of catechol (C_{6}H_{4}O_{2}SO_{2}).
