= Nathan Kornblum =

American chemist

- Born: March 22, 1914; New York, New York
- Died: March 13, 1993 (aged 78); West Lafayette, Indiana
- Occupation: Professor at Purdue University
- Known for: Kornblum oxidation, Kornblum's rule

Nathan Kornblum (March 22, 1914 – March 13, 1993) was a professor of organic chemistry and a researcher at Purdue University. He received grants for projects from 1970 to 1983.

He was born in New York City on March 22, 1914, to immigrant parents, Frances (Newmark) and Samuel Kornblum. His main research focus was electron transfer substitution reactions. His most famous work was the discovery of the Kornblum oxidation and also the Kornblum substitution. He was also known for Kornblum's rule in acid-base chemistry. He was the Plutonium chapter advisor for Iota Sigma Pi Honors Society for Women in Chemistry, which was established in February 1963. In 1952, he received a Guggenheim Fellowship award. He authored a chapter in an Organic Reactions textbook which was published in 2011, and wrote a review entitled "Synthetic Aspects of Electron-Transfer Chemistry" which was published in 1990 by Sigma-Aldrich.
