= Kornblum oxidation =

Chemical reaction

Named after	Nathan Kornblum
Reaction type	Organic redox reaction

The Kornblum oxidation, named after Nathan Kornblum, is an organic oxidation reaction that converts alkyl halides and tosylates into carbonyl compounds.

== Mechanism ==
Similar to sulfonium-based oxidation of alcohols to aldehydes reactions, the Kornblum oxidation creates an alkoxysulfonium ion, which, in the presence of a base, such as triethylamine (Et_{3}N), undergoes an elimination reaction to form the aldehyde or ketone.

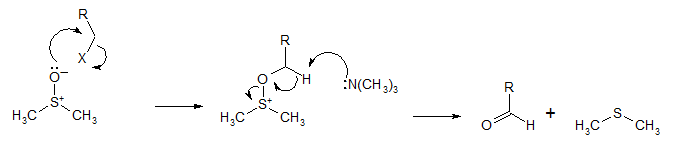

== Extensions ==
The first step is an S_{N}2 reaction, so it is subject to the usual leaving group limitations of that reaction. While iodides work well, even bromides are often not reactive enough to be displaced by the DMSO. However, using an additive such as silver tetrafluoroborate allows the reaction to work on a wider range of substrates, as often seen for alkyl-halide substitutions, or they can be converted first to the corresponding alkyl tosylate. The reaction was initially limited to activated substrates, such as benzylic and α-halo ketones. To increase the range of viable substrates, Kornblum later added a preliminary conversion of the halide to a tosylate, which is a better leaving group, to the protocol, and using pyridine-N-oxide or similar reagents rather than DMSO. The Ganem oxidation built on this latter modification, expanding on the use of various N-oxide reagents.
