= Daniel Swern =

American chemist (1916–1982)

- Born: January 21, 1916; New York City, United States
- Died: December 5, 1982 (aged 66); Philadelphia, United States
- Education: University of Maryland
- Known for: Swern oxidation
- Scientific career
- Workplaces: Temple University

Daniel Swern (January 21, 1916 – December 5, 1982) was an American chemist who invented the Swern oxidation.
