= Ganem oxidation =

Chemical reaction

Named after	Bruce Ganem
Reaction type	Organic redox reaction

In organic chemistry, the Ganem oxidation is a name reaction that allows for the preparation of carbonyls from primary or secondary alkyl halides with the use of trialkylamine N-oxides, such as N-methylmorpholine N-oxide or trimethylamine N-oxide.

== Mechanism ==
As in other oxoammonium-catalyzed oxidation reactions, the negatively charged oxygen atom of the trialkylamine N-oxide molecule attacks the alkyl halide in a S_{N}2 manner, kicking off the halide as a leaving group. A trialkylamine deprotonates the α-carbon atom, the resulting electron pair shifts onto the oxygen atom, which shifts its own excess electron pair onto the nitrogen atom. This generates the desired carbonyl, as well as the aforementioned trialkylamine. The reaction is an enhancement of the Kornblum oxidation protocol, which was originally developed using dimethyl sulfoxide or pyridine-N-oxide as the nucleophile.

== Applications ==
The Ganem oxidation has been used as an intermediate step in the total synthesis of (−)-okilactomycin, converting a primary alkyl halide into an aldehyde.
