= ZSM-5 =

Zeolite used as a catalyst in oil refining

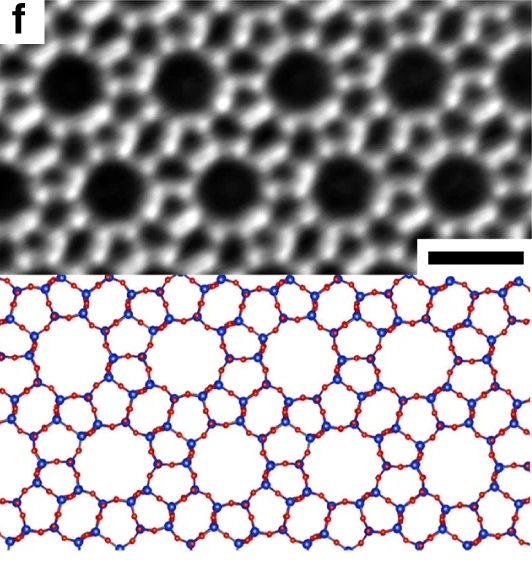
Electron micrograph and structure of ZSM-5. Blue balls represent Si and red balls represent O.

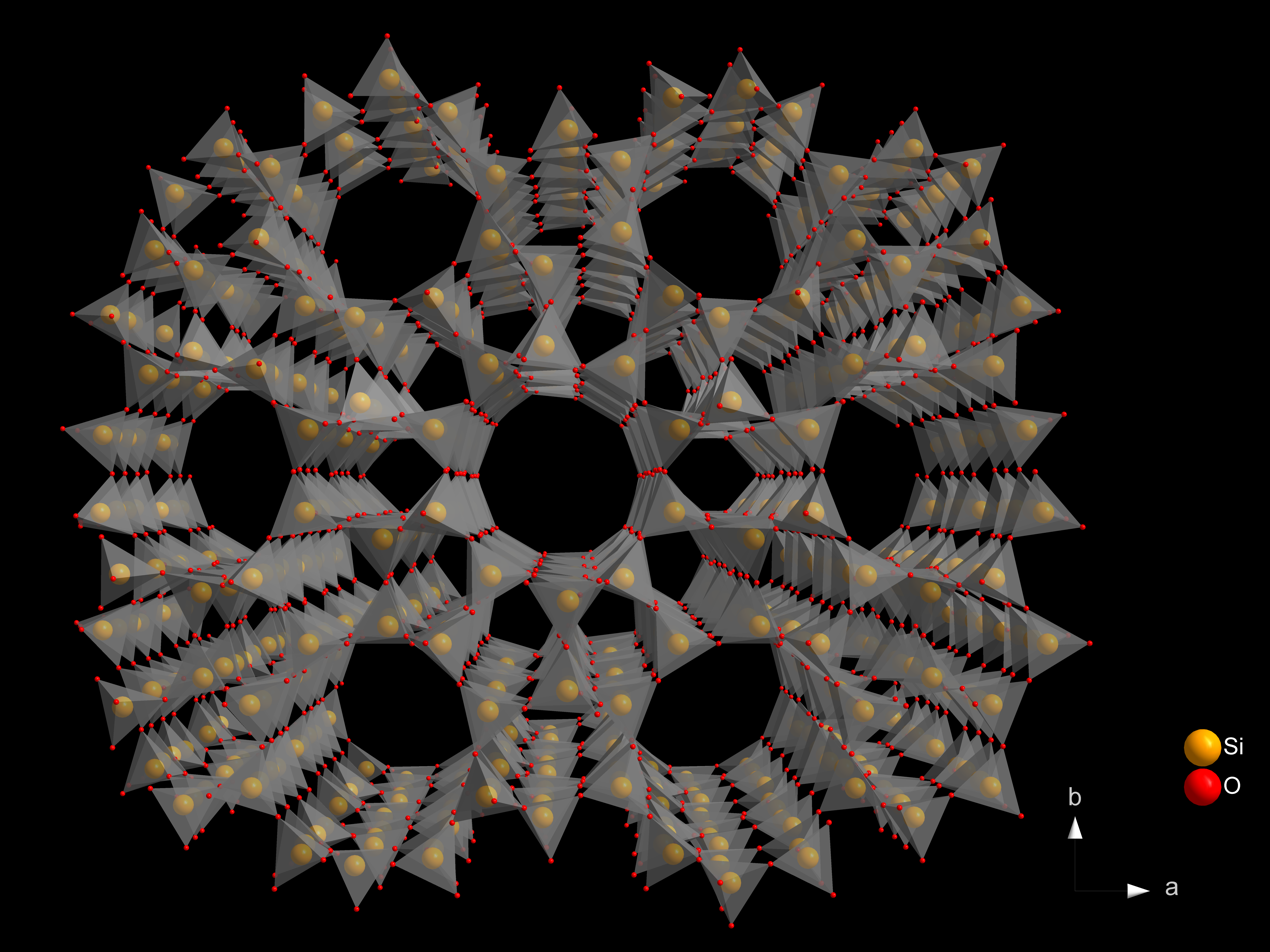
The structure of ZSM-5 showing the coordination tetrahedra.

ZSM-5, Zeolite Socony Mobil–5 (framework type MFI from ZSM-5 (five)), is an aluminosilicate zeolite belonging to the pentasil family of zeolites. Its chemical formula is Na_{n}Al_{n}Si_{96–n}O_{192}·16H_{2}O (0<n<27). Patented by Mobil Oil Company in 1975, it is widely used in the petroleum industry as a heterogeneous catalyst for hydrocarbon isomerization reactions.

== Structure ==
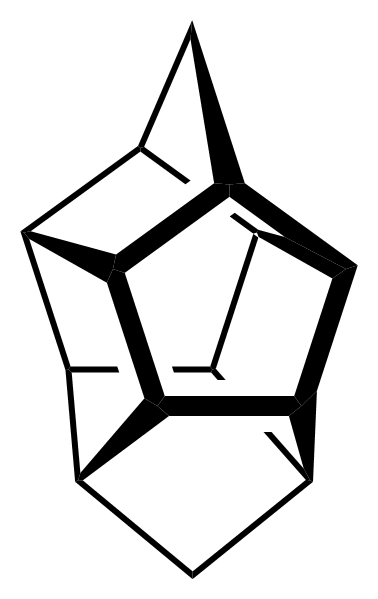
The pentasil unit of ZSM-5

ZSM-5 is composed of several pentasil units linked together by oxygen bridges to form pentasil chains. A pentasil unit consists of eight five-membered rings. In these rings, the vertices are Al or Si and an O is assumed to be bonded between the vertices. The pentasil chains are interconnected by oxygen bridges to form corrugated sheets with 10-ring holes. Like the pentasil units, each 10-ring hole has Al or Si as vertices with an O assumed to be bonded between each vertex. Each corrugated sheet is connected by oxygen bridges to form a structure with "straight 10-ring channels running parallel to the corrugations and sinusoidal 10-ring channels perpendicular to the sheets." Adjacent layers of the sheets are related by an inversion point. The estimated pore size of the channel running parallel with the corrugations is 5.4–5.6 Å. The crystallographic unit cell of ZSM-5 has 96 T sites (Si or Al), 192 O sites, and a number of compensating cations depending on the Si/Al ratio, which ranges from 12 to infinity. The structure is orthorhombic (space group Pnma) at high temperatures, but a phase transition to the monoclinic space group P2_{1}/n.1.13 occurs on cooling below a transition temperature, located between 300 and 350 K.

ZSM-5 catalyst was first synthesized by Robert Argauer and George Landolt in 1969. It is a medium pore zeolite with channels defined by ten-membered rings. The synthesis involves three different solutions. The first solution is the source of alumina, sodium ions, and hydroxide ions; in the presence of excess base the alumina will form soluble Al(OH)_{4}^{−} ions. The second solution has the tetrapropylammonium cation that acts as a templating agent. The third solution is the source of silica, one of the basic building blocks for the framework structure of a zeolite. Mixing the three solutions produces supersaturated tetrapropylammonium ZSM-5, which can be heated to recrystallize and produce a solid.

== Background of the invention ==
Pentasil-zeolites are defined by their structure type, and more specifically by their X-ray diffraction patterns. ZSM -5 is the trade name of a pentasil-zeolite.

As early as 1967, Argauer and Landolt worked out parameters for the synthesis of pentasilzeolites, particularly those relating to the following molar ratios: OH^{−}/SiO_{2} = 0.07–10, SiO_{2}/Al_{2}O_{3} = 5–100, H_{2}O/SiO_{2} = 1–240. However, the Argauer and Landolt procedure succeeded in synthesizing a reasonably pure phase ZSM-5 zeolite only if organic amines with a structure-giving function (i.e. template function), such as tetrapropyleneammonium compounds were used. Subsequent publications have disclosed methods of conducting the synthesis of pentasil-zeolites without requiring the very expensive, toxic and easily inflammable organic amine templates. Still other subsequent publications have disclosed substitutes for these amines. In addition to their expense, toxicity and flammability, such amines are disfavored because they are subject to thermal decomposition which can destroy the zeolite structure. Further publications have disclosed modifications of the Argauer and Landolt process directed towards improving the reactivity of the SiO_{2} and Al_{2}O_{3} starting materials.

== Synthesis ==
ZSM-5 is a synthetic zeolite, closely related to ZSM-11. There are many ways to synthesize ZSM-5; a common method is as follows:

An aqueous solution of silica, sodium aluminate, sodium hydroxide, and tetrapropylammonium bromide are combined in appropriate ratios:
SiO_{2} + NaAlO_{2} + NaOH + N(CH_{2}CH_{2}CH_{3})_{4}Br + H_{2}O → ZSM-5 + analcime + alpha-quartz

ZSM-5 is typically prepared at high temperature and high pressure in a Teflon-coated autoclave and can be prepared using varying ratios of SiO_{2} and Al containing compounds.

== Uses ==
ZSM-5 has a high silicon to aluminium ratio. Whenever an Al^{3+} cation replaces a Si^{4+} cation, an additional positive charge is required to keep the material charge-neutral. With proton (H^{+}) as the cation, the material becomes very acidic. Thus the acidity is proportional to the Al content. The very regular 3-D structure and the acidity of ZSM-5 can be utilized for acid-catalyzed reactions such as hydrocarbon isomerization and the alkylation of hydrocarbons. One such reaction is the isomerization of meta-xylene to para-xylene. Within the pores of the ZSM-5 zeolite, para-xylene has a much higher diffusion coefficient than meta-xylene. When the isomerization reaction is allowed to occur within the pores of ZSM-5, para-xylene is able to traverse along the pores of the zeolite, diffusing out of the catalyst very quickly. This size-selectivity allows the isomerization reaction to occur quickly in high yield.

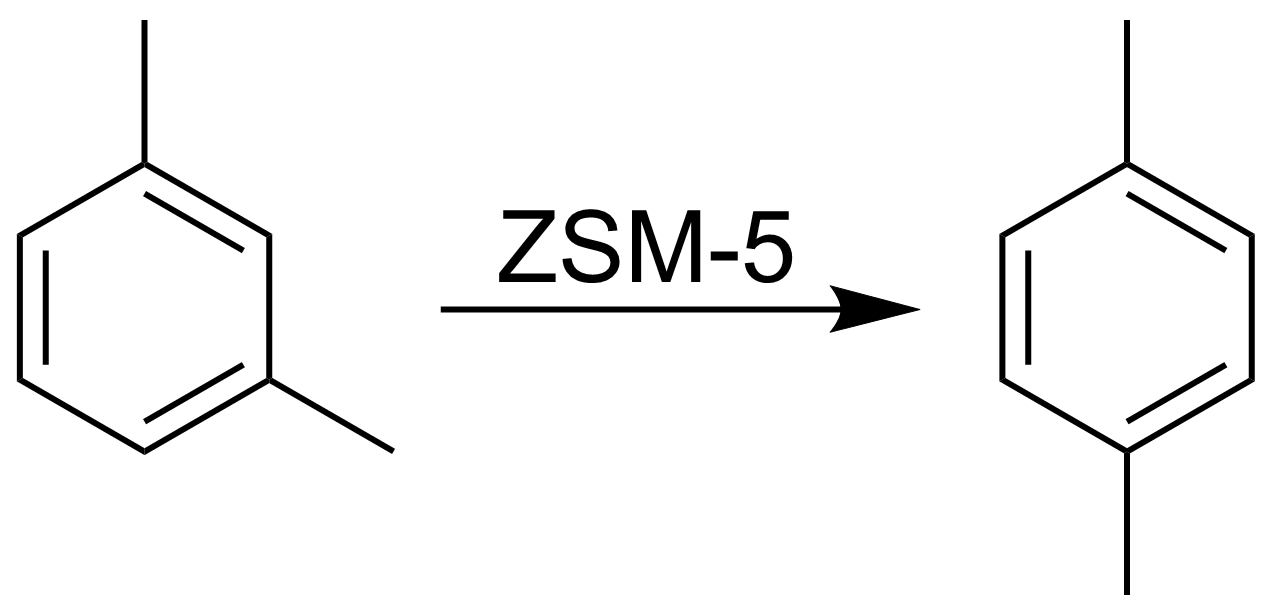
Isomerisation of meta-xylene to para-xylene on passing through a ZSM-5 catalyst.

ZSM-5 has been used as a support material for catalysis. In one such example, copper is deposited on the zeolite and a stream of ethanol is passed through at temperatures of 240 to 320 °C as a vapour stream, which causes the ethanol to oxidize to acetaldehyde; two hydrogens are lost by the ethanol as hydrogen gas. It appears that the specific pore size of ZSM-5 is of benefit to this process, which also functions for other alcohols and oxidations. The copper is occasionally combined with other metals, such as chromium, to fine tune the diversity and specificity of the products, as there is likely to be more than one. Acetic acid is an example of one possible byproduct from hot copper oxidation.

ZSM-5 is also used to convert alcohols directly into gasoline. One such process is known as the Methanol to Gasoline (MTG) process, patented by Mobil.
