= Sulfur trioxide pyridine complex =

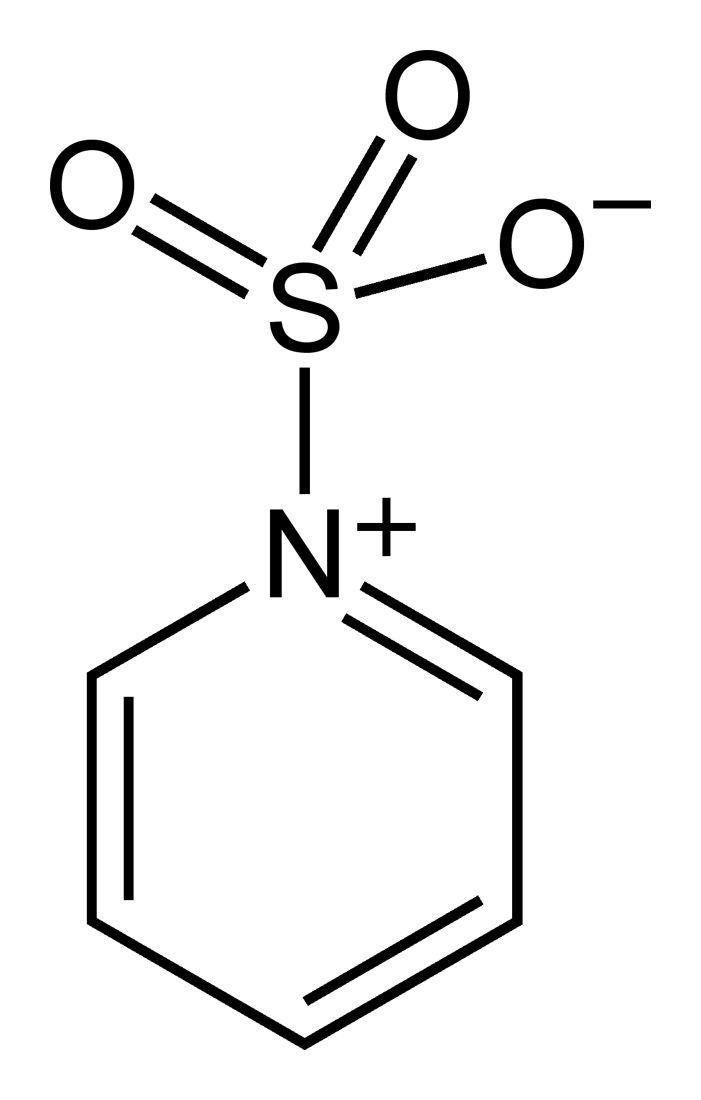

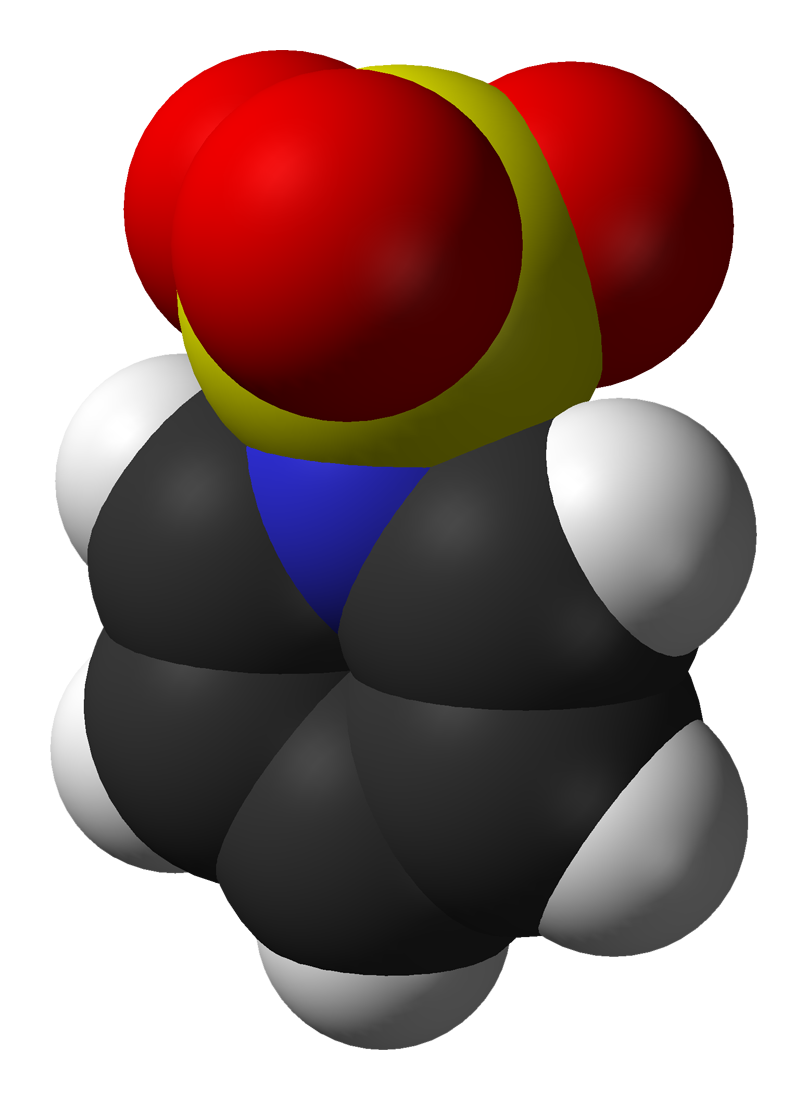

Names
- IUPAC name Pyridin-1-ium-1-sulfonate

Identifiers
CAS Number	26412-87-3
3D model (JSmol)	Interactive image
ChemSpider	147422
ECHA InfoCard	100.043.334
PubChem CID	2777373
UNII	SVL47N2N3Y
CompTox Dashboard (EPA)	DTXSID50885349
- InChI: InChI=1S/C5H5N.O3S/c1-2-4-6-5-3-1;1-4(2)3/h1-5H; Key: UDYFLDICVHJSOY-UHFFFAOYSA-N; InChI=1/C5H5N.O3S/c1-2-4-6-5-3-1;1-4(2)3/h1-5H; Key: UDYFLDICVHJSOY-UHFFFAOYAG
- SMILES: O=S(=O)=O.n1ccccc1

Properties
Chemical formula	C_{5}H_{5}NO_{3}S
Molar mass	159.16 g·mol^{−1}
Appearance	white solid
- Except where otherwise noted, data are given for materials in their standard state (at 25 °C [77 °F], 100 kPa). verify (what is ?) Infobox references

Sulfur trioxide pyridine complex is the compound with the formula C_{5}H_{5}NSO_{3}. It is a colourless solid that dissolves in polar organic solvents. It is the adduct formed from the Lewis base pyridine and the Lewis acid sulfur trioxide. The compound is mainly used as a source of sulfur trioxide, for example in the synthesis of sulfate esters from alcohols:

ROH + C_{5}H_{5}NSO_{3} → [C_{5}H_{5}NH]^{+}[ROSO_{3}]^{−}

It also is useful for sulfamations:

R_{2}NH + C_{5}H_{5}NSO_{3} → C_{5}H_{5}N + R_{2}NSO_{3}H

The compound is used for sulfonylation reactions, especially in the sulfonylation of furans. It is also an activating electrophile in a Parikh-Doering oxidation.
