= Albright–Goldman oxidation =

The Albright–Goldman oxidation is a name reaction of organic chemistry, first described by the American chemists J. Donald Albright and Leon Goldman in 1965. The reaction is particularly suitable for the synthesis of aldehydes from primary alcohols. Analogously, secondary alcohols can be oxidized to form ketones. Dimethyl sulfoxide/acetic anhydride serves as oxidizing agent.

Albright-Goldman-Oxidation (Aldehyd)

The reaction does not proceed further to the carboxylic acid.

== Reaction mechanism ==
The following figure shows the reaction mechanism:

Reaktionsmechanismus Albright-Goldman-Oxidation

First, dimethyl sulfoxide (1) reacts with acetic anhydride to form a sulfonium ion. It reacts with the primary alcohol in an addition reaction. Furthermore, acetic acid is cleaved, so that intermediate 2 is formed. The latter reacts upon elimination of acetic acid and dimethyl sulphide to the aldehyde.

== Example ==
The Albright–Goldman oxidation is a particularly mild oxidation process. Thus, it is suitable for the oxidation of compounds which are sensitive to nonselective oxidizing agents, such as indole alkaloids. This reaction can also be used for sterically hindered hydroxyl groups. An example for its application is the synthesis of the indole alkaloid yohimbine:

Beispiel Albright-Goldman-Oxidation

== Alternative reactions ==
An alternative method for the oxidation of primary alcohols to aldehydes is the Swern oxidation.
