= Corey–Kim oxidation =

Chemical reaction

Corey-Kim oxidation
Named after	Elias James Corey; Choung Un Kim
Reaction type	Organic redox reaction

Identifiers
Organic Chemistry Portal	corey-kim-oxidation

The Corey–Kim oxidation is an oxidation reaction used to synthesize aldehydes and ketones from primary and secondary alcohols. It is named for American chemist and Nobel Laureate Elias James Corey and Korean-American chemist Choung Un Kim.

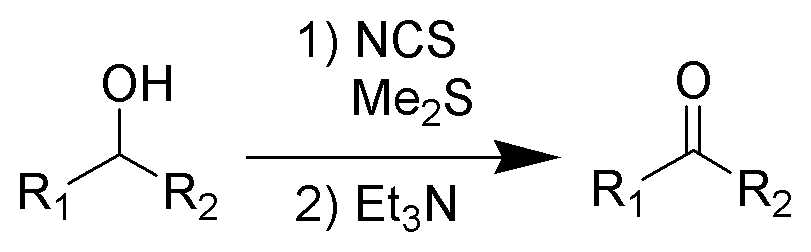
The Corey–Kim oxidation

Although the Corey–Kim oxidation possesses the distinctive advantage over Swern oxidation of allowing an operation above –25 °C, it is not so commonly used due to issues with selectivity in substrates susceptible to chlorination by N-chlorosuccinimide.

== Reaction mechanism ==
Dimethyl sulfide (Me_{2}S) is treated with N-chlorosuccinimide (NCS), resulting in formation of an "active DMSO" species that is used for the activation of the alcohol. Addition of triethylamine to the activated alcohol leads to its oxidation to aldehyde or ketone and generation of dimethyl sulfide. In variance with other alcohol oxidation using "activated DMSO," the reactive oxidizing species is not generated by reaction of DMSO with an electrophile. Rather, it is formed by oxidation of dimethyl sulfide with an oxidant (NCS).

The reaction mechanism of Corey–Kim oxidation

Under Corey–Kim conditions allylic and benzylic alcohols have a tendency to evolve to the corresponding allyl and benzyl chlorides unless the alcohol activation is very quickly followed by addition of triethylamine. In fact, Corey–Kim conditions —with no addition of triethylamine— are very efficient for the transformation of allylic and benzylic alcohols to chlorides in presence of other alcohols.

== Variations ==
Substituting dimethyl sulfide with something less noxious has been the goal of several research projects. Ohsugia et al. substituted a long-chain sulfide, dodecyl methyl sulfide, for dimethyl sulfide. Crich et al. utilized fluorous technology in a similar manner.

== See also ==
- Pfitzner–Moffatt oxidation
- Sulfonium-based oxidation of alcohols to aldehydes
