= Tetrapropylammonium perruthenate =

Names
- IUPAC name N,N,N-Tripropylpropan-1-aminium perruthenate

Identifiers
CAS Number	114615-82-6
3D model (JSmol)	Interactive image
Abbreviations	TPAP; TPAPR
ChemSpider	21170134
ECHA InfoCard	100.156.687
PubChem CID	127020979 incorrect structure
UNII	Y4N78L8V1T
CompTox Dashboard (EPA)	DTXSID20894180
- InChI: InChI=1S/C12H28N.4O.Ru/c1-5-9-13(10-6-2,11-7-3)12-8-4;;;;;/h5-12H2,1-4H3;;;;;/q+1;;;;-1; Key: NQSIKKSFBQCBSI-UHFFFAOYSA-N; InChI=1/C12H28N.4O.Ru/c1-5-9-13(10-6-2,11-7-3)12-8-4;;;;;/h5-12H2,1-4H3;;;;;/q+1;;;;-1;/rC12H28N.O4Ru/c1-5-9-13(10-6-2,11-7-3)12-8-4;1-5(2,3)4/h5-12H2,1-4H3;/q+1;-1 Key: NQSIKKSFBQCBSI-DQAXOFGLAB
- SMILES: CCC[N+](CCC)(CCC)CCC.O=[Ru](=O)([O-])=O

Properties
Chemical formula	C_{12}H_{28}NRuO_{4}
Molar mass	351.43 g/mol
Appearance	Green solid
Melting point	160 °C (320 °F; 433 K) (decomposition)

Hazards
- GHS labelling
Pictograms	(GHS03: Oxidizing) (GHS07: Exclamation mark)
Signal word	Warning
Hazard statements	H272, H315, H319, H335
Precautionary statements	P210, P220, P221, P261, P264, P271, P280, P302+P352, P304+P340, P305+P351+P338, P312, P321, P332+P313, P337+P313, P362, P370+P378, P403+P233, P405, P501
- Except where otherwise noted, data are given for materials in their standard state (at 25 °C [77 °F], 100 kPa). verify (what is ?) Infobox references

Tetrapropylammonium perruthenate (TPAP or TPAPR) is the chemical compound described by the formula N(C_{3}H_{7})_{4}RuO_{4}. Sometimes known as the Ley–Griffith reagent, this ruthenium compound is used as a reagent in organic synthesis. This salt consists of the tetrapropylammonium cation and the perruthenate anion, RuO^{−}_{4}.

== Uses ==
Oxidation of alcohol to aldehyde with TPAP (0.06 eq.) and N-methylmorpholine N-oxide (1.7 eq.) with molecular sieves in dichloromethane.

Ruthenium tetroxide is a highly aggressive oxidant, but TPAP, which is its one-electron reduced derivative, is a mild oxidizing agent for the conversion of primary alcohols to aldehydes (known as the Ley oxidation or Ley–Griffith oxidation). Secondary alcohols are similarly oxidized to ketones. It can also be used to oxidize primary alcohols all the way to the carboxylic acid with a higher catalyst loading, larger amount of the cooxidant, and addition of two equivalents of water. In this situation, the aldehyde reacts with water to form the geminal diol hydrate, which is then oxidized again.

The oxidation generates water that can be removed by adding molecular sieves. TPAP is expensive, but it can be used in catalytic amounts. The catalytic cycle is maintained by adding a stoichiometric amount of a co-oxidant such as N-methylmorpholine N-oxide or molecular oxygen.

TPAP is also used to cleave vicinal diols to form aldehydes.
