= N-Propylmagnesium bromide =

n-Propylmagnesium bromide

Identifiers
CAS Number	927-77-5
3D model (JSmol)	Interactive image
ChemSpider	10265325
ECHA InfoCard	100.011.967
EC Number	213-162-4
PubChem CID	101916
CompTox Dashboard (EPA)	DTXSID00918999
- InChI: InChI=1S/C3H7.BrH.Mg/c1-3-2;;/h1,3H2,2H3;1H;/q-1;;+2/p-1 Key: UGVPKMAWLOMPRS-UHFFFAOYSA-M
- SMILES: CC[CH2-].[Mg+2].[Br-]

Properties
Chemical formula	C_{3}H_{7}BrMg
Molar mass	147.298 g·mol^{−1}
- Except where otherwise noted, data are given for materials in their standard state (at 25 °C [77 °F], 100 kPa). Infobox references

n-Propylmagnesium bromide, often referred to as simply propylmagnesium bromide, is an organomagnesium compound with the chemical formula C_{3}H_{6}MgBr. As the Grignard reagent derived from 1-bromopropane, it is used for the n-propylation of electrophiles in organic synthesis.

== Properties ==
Like all Grignard reagents, propylmagnesium bromide is a strong nucleophile, sensitive to both water and air.

The propylmagnesium halides are the simplest Grignard reagents to exhibit isomerism. Isopropylmagnesium chloride is the primary synthetic equivalent of the isopropyl group.

n-Propylmagnesium bromide is soluble in ether, tetrahydrofuran, and toluene.

== Synthesis ==
Synthesis is analogous to other saturated alkyl Grignard reagents. A solution of 1-bromopropane in ether - typically diethyl ether or tetrahydrofuran - is treated with magnesium, which inserts itself into the organohalogen bond. As both the magnesium metal and the product are sensitive to water, the reaction must take place in anhydrous conditions.

C_{3}H_{6}−Br + Mg → C_{3}H_{6}−Mg−Br

While the product is often portrayed as simply C_{3}H_{6}MgBr, in reality it will quickly form a tetrahedral coordination complex with the Lewis basic solvent, centred on the magnesium atom:

C_{3}H_{6}MgBr + 2 (C_{2}H_{5})_{2}O → C_{3}H_{6}Mg((C_{2}H_{5})_{2}O)_{2}Br
C_{3}H_{6}MgBr + 2 (CH_{2})_{4}O → C_{3}H_{6}Mg((CH_{2})_{4}O)_{2}Br

== Applications ==
Propylmagnesium bromide is used in the Grignard reaction to introduce propyl groups to nucleophiles.
