= Aldehyde =

Organic compound containing the functional group R–CH=O

Aldehyde structure

In organic chemistry, an aldehyde (/ˈældɪhaɪd/) (lat. alcohol dehydrogenatum, dehydrogenated alcohol) is an organic compound containing a functional group with the structure R−CH=O. The functional group itself (without the "R" side chain) can be referred to as an aldehyde but can also be classified as a formyl group. Aldehydes are a common motif in many chemicals important in technology and biology.

== Structure and bonding ==
Aldehyde molecules have a central carbon atom that is connected by a double bond to oxygen, a single bond to hydrogen and another single bond to a third substituent, which is carbon or, in the case of formaldehyde, hydrogen. The central carbon is often described as being sp^{2}-hybridized. The aldehyde group is somewhat polar. The C=O bond length is about 120–122 picometers.

== Physical properties and characterization ==
Aldehydes have properties that are diverse and that depend on the remainder of the molecule. Smaller aldehydes such as formaldehyde and acetaldehyde are soluble in water, and the volatile aldehydes have pungent odors.

Aldehydes can be identified by spectroscopic methods. Using IR spectroscopy, they display a strong ν_{CO} band near 1700 cm^{−1}. In their ^{1}H NMR spectra, the formyl hydrogen center absorbs near δ_{H} 9.5 to 10, which is a distinctive part of the spectrum. This signal shows the characteristic coupling to any protons on the α carbon with a small coupling constant typically less than 3.0 Hz. The ^{13}C NMR spectra of aldehydes and ketones gives a suppressed (weak) but distinctive signal at δ_{C} 190 to 205.

== Applications and occurrence ==

Important aldehydes and related compounds. The aldehyde group (or formyl group) is colored red. From the left: (1) formaldehyde and (2) its trimer 1,3,5-trioxane, (3) acetaldehyde and (4) its enol vinyl alcohol, (5) glucose (pyranose form as α-D-glucopyranose), (6) the flavorant cinnamaldehyde, (7) retinal, which forms with opsins photoreceptors, and (8) the vitamin pyridoxal.

=== Naturally occurring aldehydes ===
Traces of many aldehydes are found in essential oils and often contribute to their pleasant odours, including cinnamaldehyde, cilantro, and vanillin. Possibly due to the high reactivity of the formyl group, aldehydes are not commonly found in organic "building block" molecules, such as amino acids, nucleic acids, and lipids. However, most sugars are derivatives of aldehydes. These aldoses exist as hemiacetals, a sort of masked form of the parent aldehyde. For example, in aqueous solution only a tiny fraction of glucose exists as the aldehyde.

== Synthesis ==
=== Hydroformylation ===
Of the several methods for preparing aldehydes, one dominant technology is hydroformylation. Hydroformylation is conducted on a very large scale for diverse aldehydes. It involves treatment of the alkene with a mixture of hydrogen gas and carbon monoxide in the presence of a metal catalyst. Illustrative is the generation of butyraldehyde by hydroformylation of propylene:

H_{2} + CO + CH_{3}CH=CH_{2} → CH_{3}CH_{2}CH_{2}CHO

One complication with this process is the formation of isomers, such as isobutyraldehyde:

H_{2} + CO + CH_{3}CH=CH_{2} → CH_{3}CH(CHO)CH_{3}

=== Oxidative routes ===
The largest operations involve methanol and ethanol respectively to formaldehyde and acetaldehyde, which are produced on multimillion ton scale annually. Other large scale aldehydes are produced by autoxidation of hydrocarbons: benzaldehyde from toluene, acrolein from propylene, and methacrolein from isobutene. In the Wacker process, oxidation of ethylene to acetaldehyde in the presence of copper and palladium catalysts, is also used. "Green" and cheap oxygen (or air) is the oxidant of choice.

Laboratories may instead apply a wide variety of specialized oxidizing agents, which are often consumed stoichiometrically. Chromium(VI) reagents are popular. Oxidation can be achieved by heating the alcohol with an acidified solution of potassium dichromate. In this case, excess dichromate will further oxidize the aldehyde to a carboxylic acid, so either the aldehyde is distilled out as it forms (if volatile) or milder reagents such as PCC are used.

A variety of reagent systems achieve aldehydes under chromium-free conditions. One such are the hypervalent organoiodine compounds (i.e., IBX acid, Dess–Martin periodinane), although these often also oxidize the α position. A Lux-Flood acid will activate various sulfoxides (e.g. the Swern oxidation), and amine oxides convert alkyl halides to aldehydes (e.g., the Ganem oxidation). Sterically-hindered nitroxyls (i.e., TEMPO) can catalyze aldehyde formation with a cheaper oxidant.

Alternatively, vicinal diols or their oxidized sequelae (acyloins or α-hydroxy acids) can be oxidized with cleavage to two aldehydes or an aldehyde and carbon dioxide.

=== Specialty methods ===
Reaction name	Substrate	Comment
Ozonolysis	Alkenes	Reductive work-up; similar effect with singlet oxygen and no work-up
Carbonyl reduction	Esters, amides	Reduction of an ester with diisobutylaluminium hydride (DIBAL-H) or sodium aluminium hydride; see also amide reduction.
Rosenmund reaction	Acyl chlorides	Acyl chlorides selectively reduced to aldehydes. Lithium tri-t-butoxyaluminium hydride (LiAlH(O^{t}Bu)_{3}) is an effective reagent.
Wittig reaction	Ketones	A modified Wittig reaction using methoxymethylenetriphenylphosphine as a reagent.
Formylation reactions	Nucleophilic arenes	Various reactions, for example the Vilsmeier-Haack reaction.
Nef reaction	Nitro compounds	The acid hydrolysis of a primary nitro compound to form an aldehyde.
Kornblum oxidation	Haloalkanes	The oxidation of primary halide with dimethyl sulfoxide to form an aldehyde.
Zincke reaction	Pyridines	Zincke aldehydes formed in a reaction variation.
Stephen aldehyde synthesis	Nitriles	Hydrolysis of an iminium salt generated by tin(II) chloride and HCl to form an aldehyde.
Geminal halide hydrolysis	Geminal dihalides	Hydrolysis of primary geminal dihalides to yield aldehydes.
Meyers synthesis	Oxazines	Hemiaminal oxazine hydrolysis with water and oxalic acid to yield an aldehyde.
Hofmann rearrangement variation	Unsaturated or α-hydroxy amides	Aldehydes via the hydrolysis of an intermediate carbamate.
McFadyen-Stevens reaction	Hydrazides	Base-catalyzed thermal decomposition of acylsulfonylhydrazides.
Biotransformation	Alkenes	Lyophilized cell cultures of Trametes hirsuta in the presence of oxygen.
Decarbonylation	A-hydroxy acids	Catalyzed by concentrated sulfuric acid

== Common reactions ==
Aldehydes participate in many reactions. Some industrially relevant reactions:

- condensations, e.g., to prepare plasticizers and polyols.
- reduction to produce alcohols, especially "oxo-alcohols".

From the biological perspective, the key reactions involve addition of nucleophiles to the formyl carbon in the formation of imines (oxidative deamination) and hemiacetals (structures of aldose sugars).

=== Acid-base reactions ===
Because of resonance stabilization of the conjugate base, an α-hydrogen in an aldehyde is weakly acidic with a pK_{a} near 17. This acidification of the α-hydrogen in aldehyde is attributed to:

- the electron-withdrawing quality of the formyl center and
- the fact that the conjugate base, an enolate anion, delocalizes its negative charge.

The formyl proton itself does not readily undergo deprotonation.

=== Enolization ===
Aldehydes (except those without an alpha carbon, or without protons on the alpha carbon, such as formaldehyde and benzaldehyde) can exist in either the keto or the enol tautomer. Keto–enol tautomerism is catalyzed by either acid or base. In neutral solution, the enol is the minority tautomer, reversing several times per second. But it becomes the dominant tautomer in strong acid or base solutions, and enolized aldehydes undergo nucleophilic attack at the α position.

=== Reduction ===
The formyl group can be readily reduced to a primary alcohol (−CH_{2}OH). Typically this conversion is accomplished by catalytic hydrogenation either directly or by transfer hydrogenation. Stoichiometric reductions are also popular, as can be effected with sodium borohydride.

=== Oxidation ===
The formyl group readily oxidizes to the corresponding carboxyl group (−COOH). The preferred oxidant in industry is oxygen or air. In the laboratory, popular oxidizing agents include potassium permanganate, nitric acid, chromium(VI) oxide, and chromic acid. The combination of manganese dioxide, cyanide, acetic acid and methanol will convert the aldehyde to a methyl ester.

Another oxidation reaction is the basis of the silver-mirror test. In this test, an aldehyde is treated with Tollens' reagent, which is prepared by adding a drop of sodium hydroxide solution into silver nitrate solution to give a precipitate of silver(I) oxide, and then adding just enough dilute ammonia solution to redissolve the precipitate in aqueous ammonia to produce [Ag(NH_{3})_{2}]^{+} complex. This reagent converts aldehydes to carboxylic acids without attacking carbon–carbon double bonds. The name silver-mirror test arises because this reaction produces a precipitate of silver, whose presence can be used to test for the presence of an aldehyde.

A further oxidation reaction involves Fehling's reagent as a test. The Cu^{2+} complex ions are reduced to a red-brick-coloured Cu_{2}O precipitate.

Aromatic aldehydes, such as benzaldehyde, do not give a positive Fehling's test, because they are not easily oxidized by mild oxidizing agents like Fehling's reagent. The benzene ring provides stability, while steric hindrance prevents the formation of the required hydrated anion intermediate.

If the aldehyde cannot form an enolate (e.g., benzaldehyde), addition of strong base induces the Cannizzaro reaction. This reaction results in disproportionation, producing a mixture of alcohol and carboxylic acid.

=== Nucleophilic addition reactions ===
Nucleophiles add readily to the carbonyl group. In the product, the carbonyl carbon becomes sp^{3}-hybridized, being bonded to the nucleophile, and the oxygen center becomes protonated:

RCHO + Nu^{−} → RCH(Nu)O^{−}
RCH(Nu)O^{−} + H^{+} → RCH(Nu)OH

In many cases, a water molecule is removed after the addition takes place; in this case, the reaction is classed as an addition–elimination or addition–condensation reaction. There are many variations of nucleophilic addition reactions.

==== Oxygen nucleophiles ====
In the acetalisation reaction, under acidic or basic conditions, an alcohol adds to the carbonyl group and a proton is transferred to form a hemiacetal. Under acidic conditions, the hemiacetal and the alcohol can further react to form an acetal and water. Simple hemiacetals are usually unstable, although cyclic ones such as glucose can be stable. Acetals are stable, but revert to the aldehyde in the presence of acid. Aldehydes can react with water to form hydrates, R−CH(OH)_{2}. These diols are stable when strong electron withdrawing groups are present, as in chloral hydrate. The mechanism of formation is identical to hemiacetal formation.

Another aldehyde molecule can also act as the nucleophile to give polymeric or oligomeric acetals called paraldehydes.

==== Nitrogen nucleophiles ====
In alkylimino-de-oxo-bisubstitution, a primary or secondary amine adds to the carbonyl group and a proton is transferred from the nitrogen to the oxygen atom to create a carbinolamine. In the case of a primary amine, a water molecule can be eliminated from the carbinolamine intermediate to yield an imine or its trimer, a hexahydrotriazine This reaction is catalyzed by acid. Hydroxylamine (NH_{2}OH) can also add to the carbonyl group. After the elimination of water, this results in an oxime. An ammonia derivative of the form H_{2}NNR_{2} such as hydrazine (H_{2}NNH_{2}) or 2,4-dinitrophenylhydrazine can also be the nucleophile and after the elimination of water, resulting in the formation of a hydrazone, which are usually orange crystalline solids. This reaction forms the basis of a test for aldehydes and ketones.

==== Carbon nucleophiles ====
The cyano group in HCN can add to the carbonyl group to form cyanohydrins, R−CH(OH)CN. In this reaction the CN^{−} ion is the nucleophile that attacks the partially positive carbon atom of the carbonyl group. The mechanism involves a pair of electrons from the carbonyl-group double bond transferring to the oxygen atom, leaving it single-bonded to carbon and giving the oxygen atom a negative charge. This intermediate ion rapidly reacts with H^{+}, such as from the HCN molecule, to form the alcohol group of the cyanohydrin.

Organometallic compounds, such as organolithium reagents, Grignard reagents, or acetylides, undergo nucleophilic addition reactions, yielding a substituted alcohol group. Related reactions include organostannane additions, Barbier reactions, and the Nozaki–Hiyama–Kishi reaction.

In the aldol reaction, the metal enolates of ketones, esters, amides, and carboxylic acids add to aldehydes to form β-hydroxycarbonyl compounds (aldols). Acid or base-catalyzed dehydration then leads to α,β-unsaturated carbonyl compounds. The combination of these two steps is known as the aldol condensation.

The Prins reaction occurs when a nucleophilic alkene or alkyne reacts with an aldehyde as electrophile. The product of the Prins reaction varies with reaction conditions and substrates employed.

==== Bisulfite reaction ====
Aldehydes characteristically form "addition compounds" with bisulfites:

RCHO + HSO^{−}_{3} → RCH(OH)SO^{−}_{3}

This reaction is used as a test for aldehydes and is useful for separation or purification of aldehydes.

=== More complex reactions ===
Reaction name	Product	Comment
Wolff–Kishner reduction	Alkane	If an aldehyde is converted to a simple hydrazone (RCH=NHNH_{2}) and this is heated with a base such as KOH, the terminal carbon is fully reduced to a methyl group. The Wolff–Kishner reaction may be performed as a one-pot reaction, giving the overall conversion RCH=O → RCH_{3}.
Pinacol coupling reaction	Diol	With reducing agents such as magnesium
Wittig reaction	Alkene	Reagent: an ylide
Takai reaction	Alkene	Diorganochromium reagent
Corey–Fuchs reactions	Alkyne	Phosphine-dibromomethylene reagent
Ohira–Bestmann reaction	Alkyne	Reagent: dimethyl (diazomethyl)phosphonate
Johnson–Corey–Chaykovsky reaction	Epoxide	Reagent: a sulfonium ylide
Oxo-Diels–Alder reaction	Pyran	Aldehydes can, typically in the presence of suitable catalysts, serve as partners in cycloaddition reactions. The aldehyde serves as the dienophile component, giving a pyran or related compound.
Hydroacylation	Ketone	In hydroacylation an aldehyde is added over an unsaturated bond to form a ketone.
Decarbonylation	Alkane	Catalysed by transition metals

== Dialdehydes ==
A dialdehyde is an organic chemical compound with two aldehyde groups. The nomenclature of dialdehydes have the ending -dial or sometimes -dialdehyde. Short aliphatic dialdehydes are sometimes named after the diacid from which they can be derived. An example is butanedial, which is also called succinaldehyde (from succinic acid).

== Biochemistry ==
Some aldehydes are substrates for aldehyde dehydrogenase enzymes which metabolize aldehydes in the body. There are toxicities associated with some aldehydes that are related to neurodegenerative disease, heart disease, and some types of cancer.

== Examples of aldehydes ==
- Formaldehyde (methanal)
- Acetaldehyde (ethanal)
- Propionaldehyde (propanal)
- Butyraldehyde (butanal)
- Isovaleraldehyde
- Benzaldehyde (phenylmethanal)
- Cinnamaldehyde
- Vanillin
- Tolualdehyde
- Furfural
- Retinaldehyde
- Glycolaldehyde

== Examples of dialdehydes ==
- Glutaraldehyde
- Glyoxal
- Malondialdehyde
- Phthalaldehyde
- Succindialdehyde

== Uses ==
Of all aldehydes, formaldehyde is produced on the largest scale, about 6000000 tons per year. It is mainly used in the production of resins when combined with urea, melamine, and phenol (e.g., Bakelite). It is a precursor to methylene diphenyl diisocyanate ("MDI"), a precursor to polyurethanes. The second main aldehyde is butyraldehyde, of which about 2500000 tons per year are prepared by hydroformylation. It is the principal precursor to 2-ethylhexanol, which is used as a plasticizer. Acetaldehyde once was a dominating product, but production levels have declined to less than 1000000 tons per year because it mainly served as a precursor to acetic acid, which is now prepared by carbonylation of methanol. Many other aldehydes find commercial applications, often as precursors to alcohols, the so-called oxo alcohols, which are used in detergents. Some aldehydes are produced only on a small scale (less than 1000 tons per year) and are used as ingredients in flavours and perfumes such as Chanel No. 5. Fresh, green, citrusy and nutty notes in perfumes are often due to aldehydes. These include cinnamaldehyde and its derivatives, citral, and lilial.

== Nomenclature ==
=== IUPAC names for aldehydes ===
The common names for aldehydes do not strictly follow official guidelines, such as those recommended by IUPAC, but these rules are useful. IUPAC prescribes the following nomenclature for aldehydes:

1. Acyclic aliphatic aldehydes are named as derivatives of the longest carbon chain containing the aldehyde group. Thus, HCHO is named as a derivative of methane, and CH_{3}CH_{2}CH_{2}CHO is named as a derivative of butane. The name is formed by changing the suffix -e of the parent alkane to -al, so that HCHO is named methanal, and CH_{3}CH_{2}CH_{2}CHO is named butanal.
2. In other cases, such as when a −CHO group is attached to a ring, the suffix -carbaldehyde may be used. Thus, C_{6}H_{11}CHO is known as cyclohexanecarbaldehyde. If the presence of another functional group demands the use of a suffix, the aldehyde group is named with the prefix formyl-. This prefix is preferred to methanoyl-.
3. If the compound is a natural product or a carboxylic acid, the prefix oxo- may be used to indicate which carbon atom is part of the aldehyde group; for example, CHOCH_{2}COOH is named 2-oxoethanoic acid.
4. If replacing the aldehyde group with a carboxyl group (−COOH) would yield a carboxylic acid with a trivial name, the aldehyde may be named by replacing the suffix -ic acid or -oic acid in this trivial name by -aldehyde.

=== Etymology ===
The word aldehyde was coined by Justus von Liebig as a contraction of the Latin alcohol dehydrogenatus (dehydrogenated alcohol). In the past, aldehydes were sometimes named after the corresponding alcohols, for example, vinous aldehyde for acetaldehyde. (Vinous is from Latin vinum "wine", the traditional source of ethanol, cognate with vinyl.)

The term formyl group is derived from the Latin word formica "ant". This word can be recognized in the simplest aldehyde, formaldehyde, and in the simplest carboxylic acid, formic acid.

== See also ==
- Enol
- Ketone
- Pseudoacid
- Semialdehyde
