= C7H5BrO =

The molecular formula C_{7}H_{5}BrO may refer to:

- Benzoyl bromide
- Bromobenzaldehydes
  - 2-Bromobenzaldehyde
  - 3-Bromobenzaldehyde
  - 4-Bromobenzaldehyde
- Bromotropone
