= Dess–Martin oxidation =

Chemical reaction

Named after	Daniel Benjamin Dess; James Cullen Martin
Reaction type	Organic redox reaction

Identifiers
Organic Chemistry Portal	dess-martin-oxidation
RSC ontology ID	RXNO:0000256

The Dess–Martin oxidation is an organic reaction for the oxidation of primary alcohols to aldehydes and secondary alcohols to ketones using Dess–Martin periodinane. It is named after the American chemists Daniel Benjamin Dess and James Cullen Martin, who developed the periodinane reagent in 1983.

The reaction uses a hypervalent iodine reagent similar to 2-iodoxybenzoic acid to selectively and mildly oxidize alcohols to aldehydes or ketones. The reaction is commonly conducted in chlorinated solvents such as dichloromethane or chloroform. The reaction can be done at room temperature and is quickly complete. Many other functional groups will not be affected by this reaction.

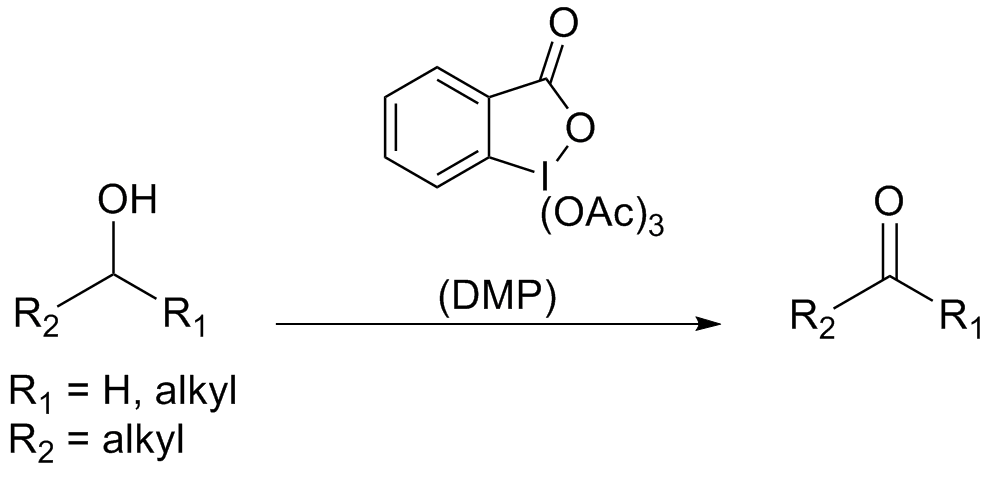

The Dess–Martin oxidation may be preferable to other oxidation reactions as it is very mild, avoids the use of toxic chromium reagents, does not require large excess or co-oxidants, and has a relatively easy workup.

Mechanism of the Dess–Martin oxidation

The reaction produces two equivalents of acetic acid. It can be buffered with pyridine or sodium bicarbonate in order to protect acid-labile compounds.

The rate of oxidation can be increased by the addition of water to the reaction mixture.
