= C7H7I =

The molecular formula C_{7}H_{7}I (molar mass: 218.03 g/mol) may refer to:

- Benzyl iodide
- Iodotoluene
