= C7H7Br =

The molecular formula C_{7}H_{7}Br (molar mass: 171.03 g/mol) may refer to:

- Benzyl bromide
- Bromotoluene
