= 4-Ethynylbenzaldehyde =

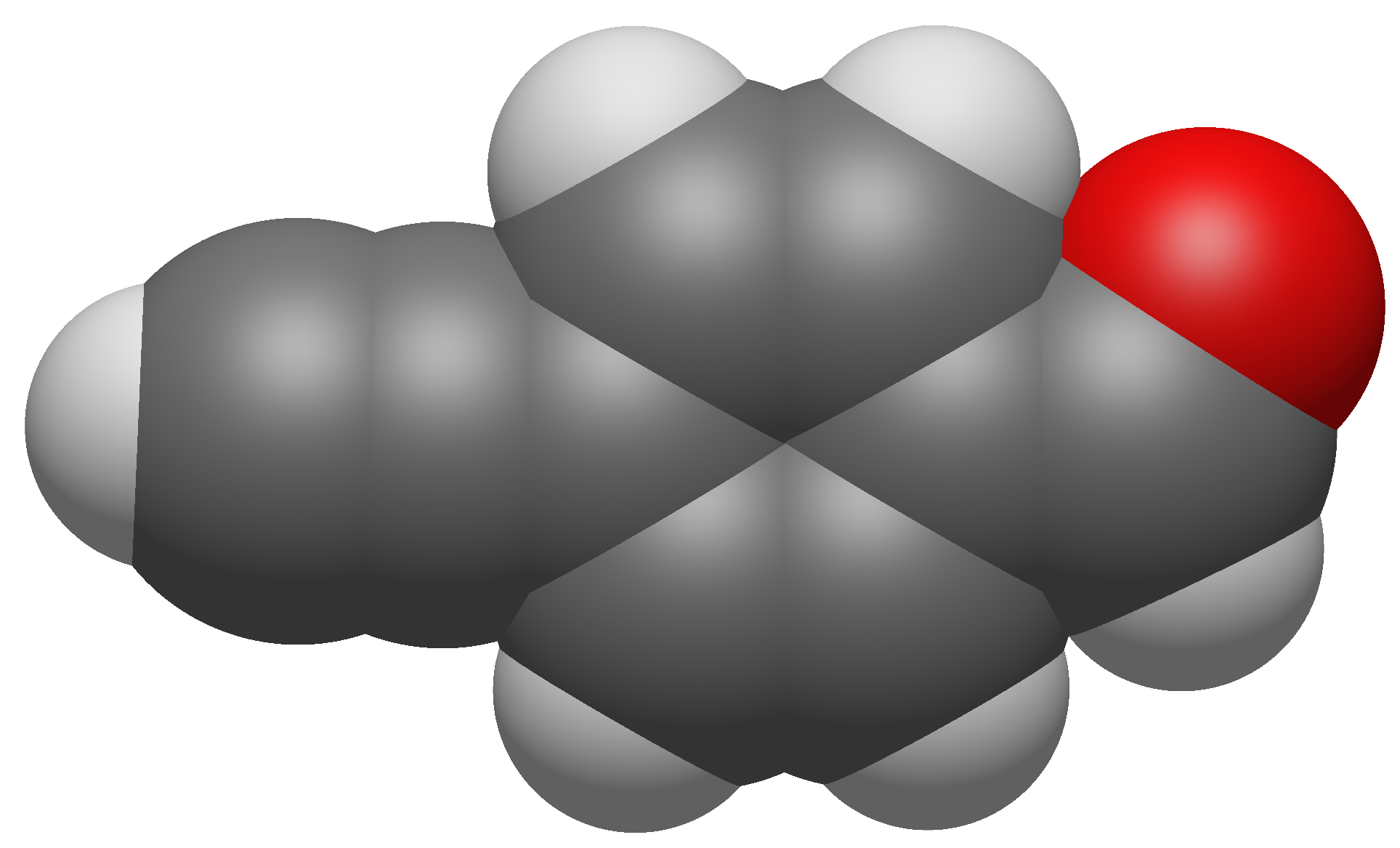

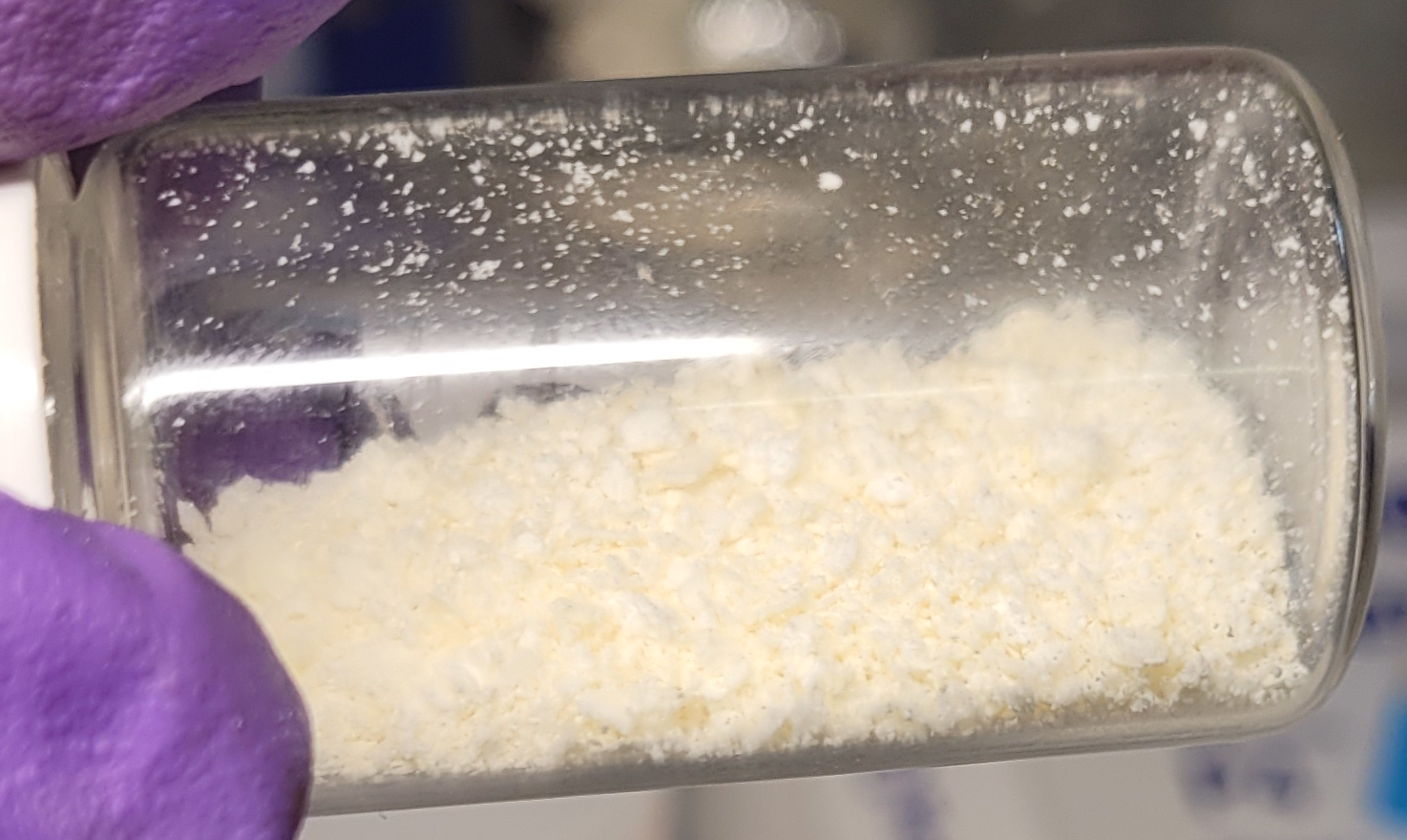

Names
- Preferred IUPAC name 4-Ethynylbenzaldehyde
- Other names p-Ethynylbenzaldehyde

Identifiers
CAS Number	63697-96-1
3D model (JSmol)	Interactive image
ChemSpider	2052086
ECHA InfoCard	100.155.717
EC Number	627-348-1
PubChem CID	2771645
CompTox Dashboard (EPA)	DTXSID10377992
- InChI: InChI=InChI = 1S/C9H6O/c1-2-8-3-5-9(7-10)6-4-8/h1,3-7H Key: BGMHQBQFJYJLBP-UHFFFAOYSA-N
- SMILES: C#CC1=CC=C(C=C1)C=O

Properties
Chemical formula	C_{9}H_{6}O
Molar mass	130.146 g·mol^{−1}
Appearance	white or yellow solid
Melting point	89–93 °C (192–199 °F; 362–366 K)
- Except where otherwise noted, data are given for materials in their standard state (at 25 °C [77 °F], 100 kPa). Infobox references

4-Ethynylbenzaldehyde, or p-ethynylbenzaldehyde, is an organic compound with the formula HC_{2}C_{6}H_{4}COH. It is an ethynyl derivative of benzaldehyde, or may also be viewed as a formylated derivative of phenylacetylene.

== Preparation ==
4-Ethynylbenzaldehyde may be prepared by the Sonogashira coupling of 4-bromobenzaldehyde with trimethylsilylacetylene to form 4-((trimethylsilyl)ethynyl)benzaldehyde, followed by removal of the trimethylsilyl group with base to form 4-ethynylbenzaldehyde.

== Reactions ==
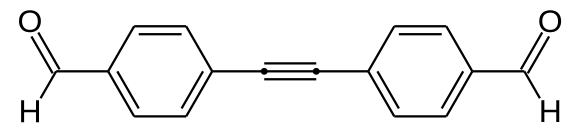
4,4'-(ethyne-1,2-diyl)dibenzaldehyde

The ethynyl functionality of 4-ethynylbenzaldehyde may undergo a Sonogashira coupling with another molecule of 4-bromobenzaldehyde to form the symmetrical dialdehyde 4,4'-(ethyne-1,2-diyl)dibenzaldehyde.
