= James Cullen Martin =

American chemist

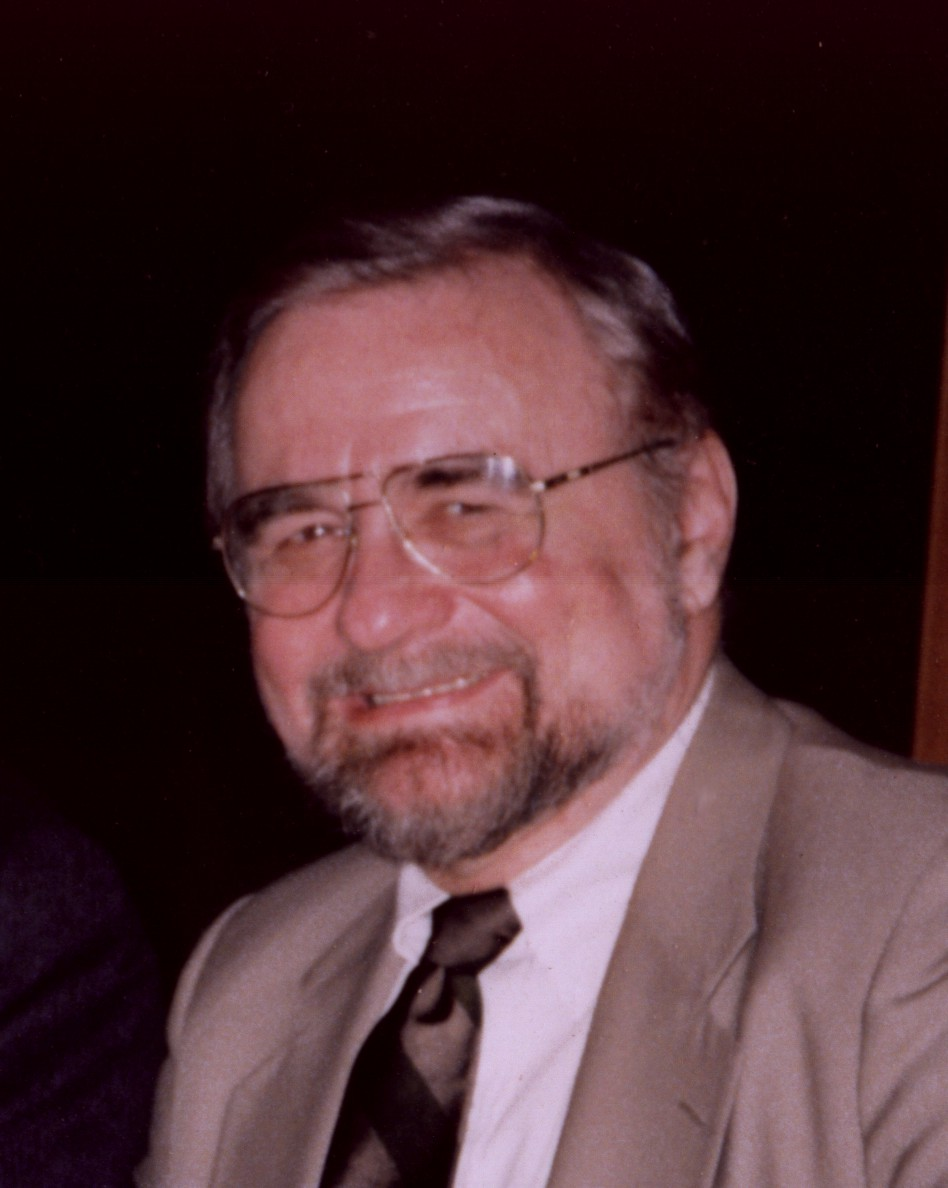
- JC Martin in Tokyo, Japan, December 19, 1991
- Born: January 14, 1928; Dover, Tennessee, United States
- Died: April 20, 1999 (aged 71); Tampa, Florida, United States
- Education: Vanderbilt University, MS 1952; Harvard University PhD 1956
- Known for: Dess–Martin periodinane
- Awards: Alexander von Humboldt Prize
- Scientific career
- Workplaces: University of Illinois 1956–1985; Vanderbilt University 1985–1992
- Doctoral advisor: Paul Doughty Bartlett

James Cullen Martin (January 14, 1928 – April 20, 1999) was an American chemist. Known in the field as "J.C.", he specialized in physical organic chemistry with an emphasis on main group element chemistry.

Martin received his undergraduate and master's degree at Vanderbilt University. His PhD work was conducted with Paul Bartlett at Harvard. Most of his professional career was at the University of Illinois at Urbana-Champaign, where he was a colleague of Roger Adams, Speed Marvel, David Y. Curtin, Nelson J. Leonard, and Reynold C. Fuson. Late in his career, he moved back to Vanderbilt, but soon succumbed to poor health.

Professor Martin is best known for his work on bonding of main group elements. He is responsible for the hexafluorocumyl alcohol derived "Martin" bidentate ligand and a tridentate analog. With his doctoral student Daniel Benjamin Dess, he invented the Dess–Martin periodinane that is used for selective oxidation of alcohols. He is also known for the creation of the Martin's sulfurane. His later work included studies of the hexaiodobenzene dication that indicated σ-delocalization ("aromaticity") between the iodine atoms.

Martin's sulfurane, illustrating J.C. Martin's interests in hypervalent molecules.

J.C. Martin received much recognition during his career, including Senior Research Prize from the Alexander von Humboldt Foundation and a Guggenheim Fellowship. He was chair of the Organic division of the American Chemical Society.

== Literature ==
- Anthony J. Arduengo (1999). "From the editor". Heteroatom Chemistry. 10 (5): 349–350. doi:10.1002/(SICI)1098-1071(1999)10:5<349::AID-HC1>3.0.CO;2-G.
