= Iodotoluene =

Group of chemical compounds

Iodotoluenes are aryl iodides based on toluene in which at least one aromatic hydrogen atom is replaced with an iodine atom. They have the general formula C_{7}H_{8–n}I_{n}, where n = 1–5 is the number of iodine atoms.

== Monoiodotoluene ==
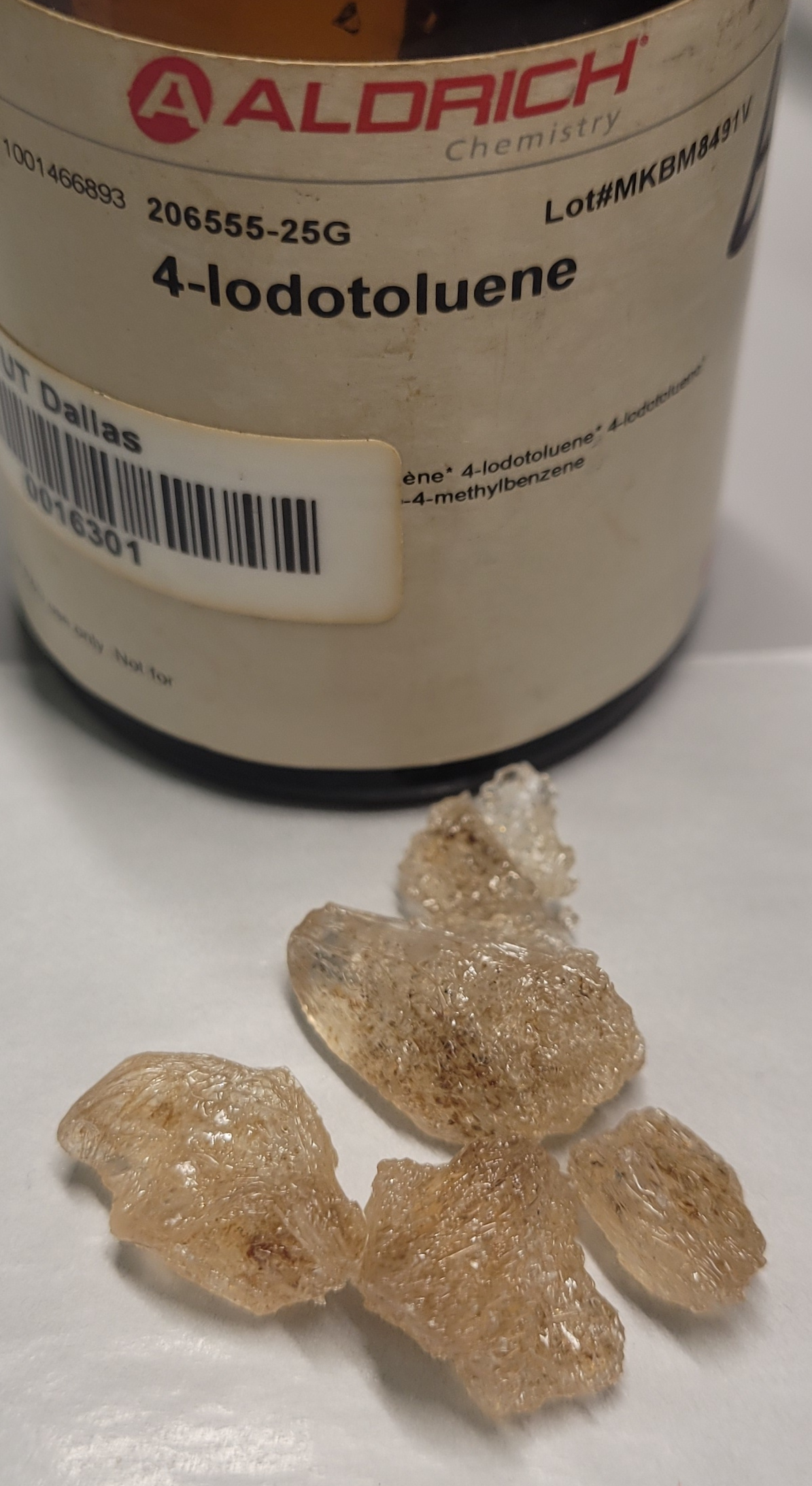
p-Iodotoluene sample

Monoiodotoluenes are iodotoluenes containing one iodine atom. There are three isomers, each with the formula C_{7}H_{7}I.

=== Properties ===
The isomers differ in the location of the iodine, but have the same chemical formula.

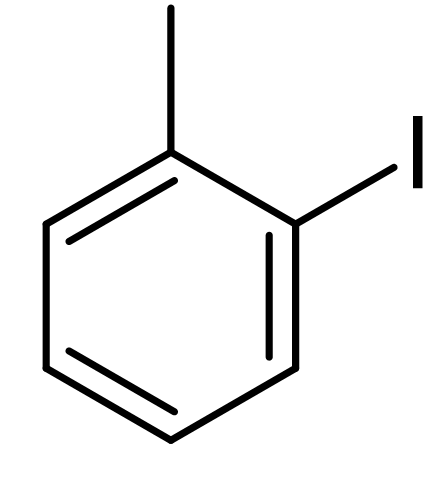
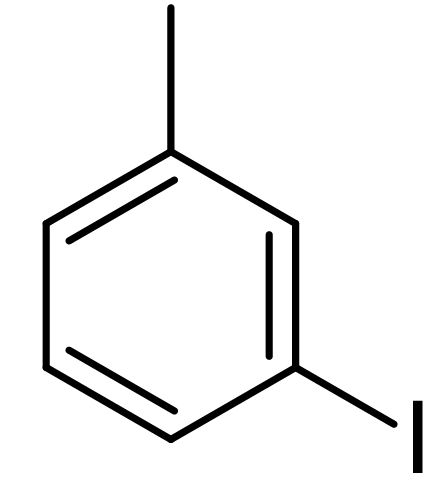
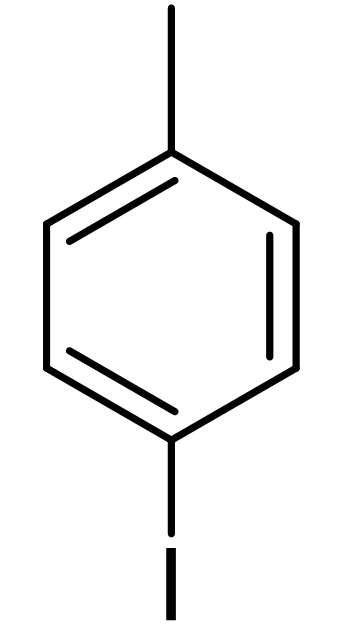
Monoiodotoluene isomers
Common name	o-iodotoluene	m-iodotoluene	p-iodotoluene
Structure
Systematic name	1-iodo-2-methylbenzene	1-iodo-3-methylbenzene	1-iodo-4-methylbenzene
Other names	2-iodotoluene	3-iodotoluene	4-iodotoluene
Molecular formula	C_{7}H_{7}I (C_{6}H_{4}ICH_{3})
Molar mass	218.03 g/mol
Appearance	Clear dark brown liquid		white to yellow solid
CAS number	[615-37-2]	[625-95-6]	[624-31-7]
Properties
Melting point			35 °C (95 °F; 308 K)
Boiling point	211-212 °C (412-414 °F; 484-485 K)		211.5 °C (412.7 °F; 484.7 K)

Benzyl iodide is an isomer, which has an iodine substituted for one of the hydrogens of toluene's methyl group, and it is sometimes named α-bromoiodine.

== Preparation ==
A laboratory route to o- and p-iodotoluene proceeds from toluene, which is treated with a mixture of iodine and nitric acid in an electrophilic aromatic substitution. The resulting mixture of o and p-iodotoluene is then separated by fractional freezing; cooling the mixture in an ice bath results in solidification of p-iodotoluene, which can then be isolated by filtration, while the o-iodotoluene remains behind as a liquid.

== Uses ==
Iodotoluenes are precursors to many organic building blocks. For example, the methyl group of o-iodotoluene and p-iodotoluene may be oxidized using potassium permanganate to form 2-iodobenzoic acid and 4-iodobenzoic acid, respectively.

== See also ==
- Chlorotoluene
- Bromotoluene
