= 2-Iodobenzoic acid =

Names
- Preferred IUPAC name 2-Iodobenzoic acid
- Other names o-Iodobenzoic acid

Identifiers
CAS Number	88-67-5
3D model (JSmol)	Interactive image
ChEBI	CHEBI:287979
ChEMBL	ChEMBL112424
ChemSpider	6675
ECHA InfoCard	100.001.682
PubChem CID	6941
UNII	7Q00V80J7Q
CompTox Dashboard (EPA)	DTXSID6058976
- InChI: InChI=1S/C7H5IO2/c8-6-4-2-1-3-5(6)7(9)10/h1-4H,(H,9,10) Key: CJNZAXGUTKBIHP-UHFFFAOYSA-N
- SMILES: O=C(O)c1ccccc1I

Properties
Chemical formula	C_{7}H_{5}IO_{2}
Molar mass	248.018 g/mol
Appearance	white solid
Density	2.25 g/cm^{3}
Melting point	162 °C (324 °F; 435 K)

Related compounds
Related compounds	4-Iodobenzoic acid
- Except where otherwise noted, data are given for materials in their standard state (at 25 °C [77 °F], 100 kPa). verify (what is ?) Infobox references

2-Iodobenzoic acid, or o-iodobenzoic acid, is an isomer of iodobenzoic acid. The synthesis of 2-iodobenzoic acid via the diazotization of anthranilic acid is commonly performed in university organic chemistry labs. One of its most common uses is as a precursor for the preparation of IBX and Dess–Martin periodinane, both used as mild oxidants.

== Synthesis ==
2-Iodobenzoic acid can be synthesized by a Sandmeyer reaction: the diazotization of anthranilic acid followed by a reaction with iodide.

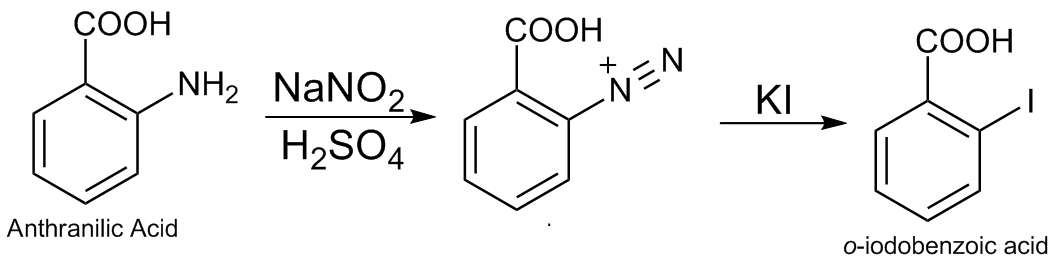
Diazo replacement of anthranilic acid.

== Applications ==
Some of the known applications of 2-iodobenzoic acid include the following list of agents: mefenamic acid flufenamic acid Moxifetin, Ketoprofen, Chlorprothixene, Benodanil.

== See also ==
- 4-Iodobenzoic acid
- 2-Chlorobenzoic acid
- 2-Fluorobenzoic acid
- 2-Bromobenzoic acid
