= 4-Bromobenzaldehyde =

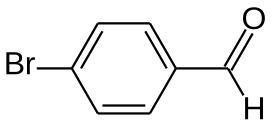

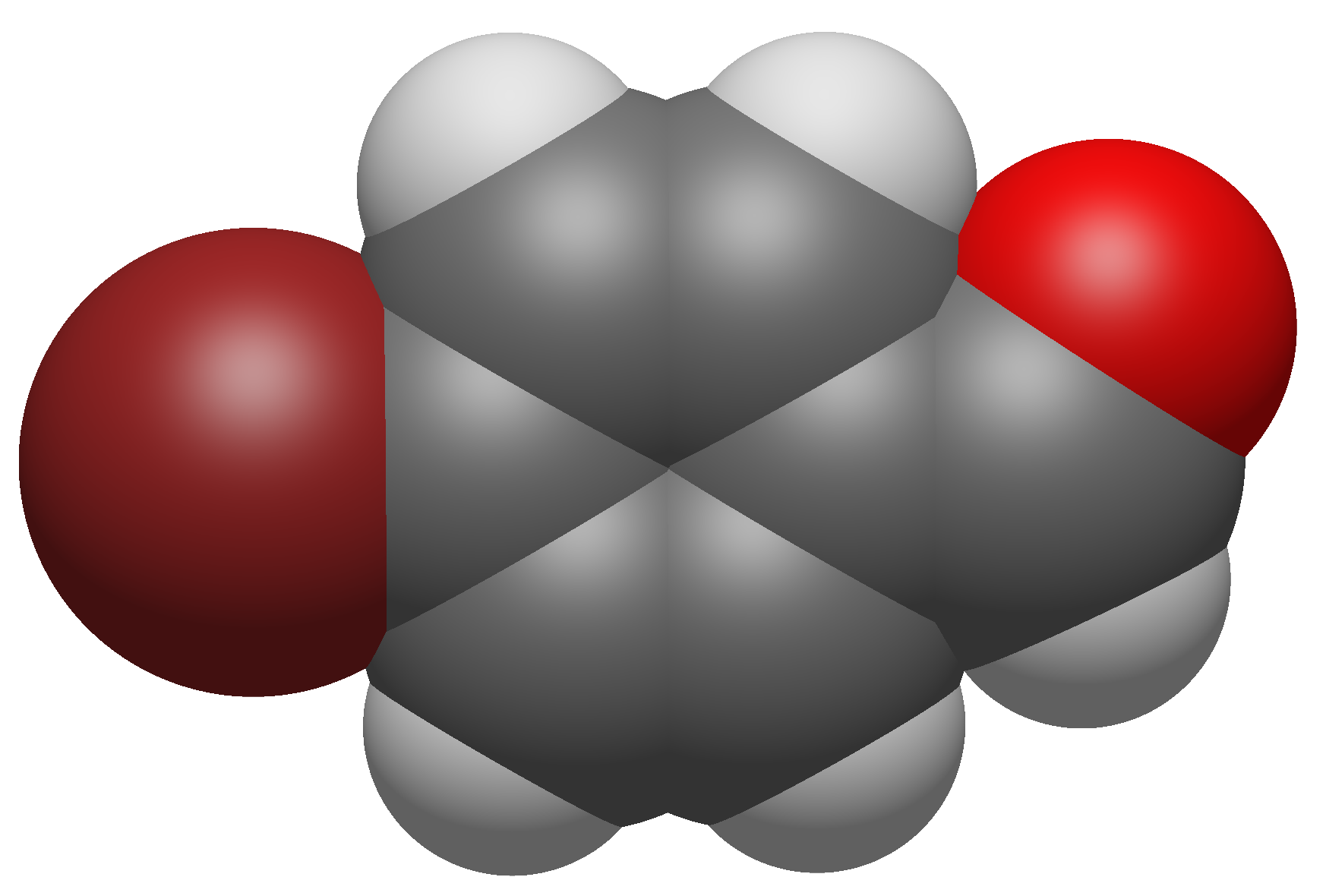

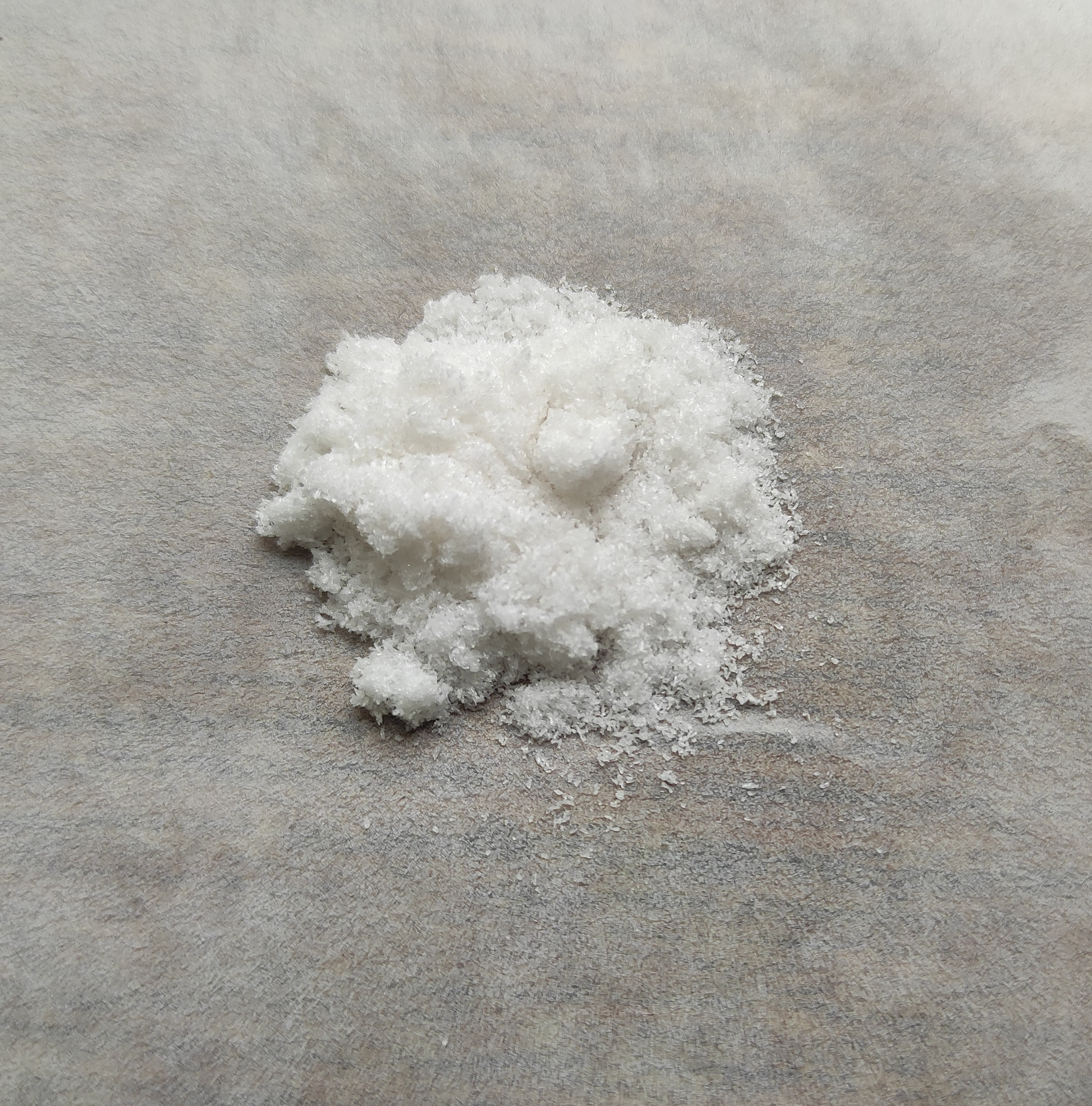

Names
- Preferred IUPAC name 4-Bromobenzaldehyde
- Other names p-Bromobenzaldehyde

Identifiers
CAS Number	1122-91-4
3D model (JSmol)	Interactive image
ChEMBL	ChEMBL3753357
ChemSpider	63906
ECHA InfoCard	100.013.060
EC Number	214-365-0
PubChem CID	70741
UNII	4L8VM24F65
CompTox Dashboard (EPA)	DTXSID5061534
- InChI: InChI=InChI = 1S/C7H5BrO/c8-7-3-1-6(5-9)2-4-7/h1-5H Key: ZRYZBQLXDKPBDU-UHFFFAOYSA-N
- SMILES: C1=CC(=CC=C1C=O)Br

Properties
Chemical formula	C_{7}H_{5}BrO
Molar mass	185.020 g·mol^{−1}
Appearance	white solid
Odor	almond
Melting point	57 °C (135 °F; 330 K)
Boiling point	255–258 °C (491–496 °F; 528–531 K)

Hazards
- GHS labelling
Pictograms	(GHS07: Exclamation mark) (GHS08: Health hazard)
Signal word	Danger
Hazard statements	H302, H315, H319, H334, H335
Precautionary statements	P233, P260, P264, P264+P265, P270, P271, P280, P284, P301+P317, P302+P352, P304+P340, P305+P351+P338, P319, P321, P330, P332+P317, P337+P317, P342+P316, P362+P364, P403, P403+P233, P405, P501

Related compounds
Related compounds	3-Bromobenzaldehyde
- Except where otherwise noted, data are given for materials in their standard state (at 25 °C [77 °F], 100 kPa). Infobox references

4-Bromobenzaldehyde, or p-bromobenzaldehyde, is an organobromine compound with the formula BrC_{6}H_{4}CHO. It is one of three isomers of bromobenzaldehyde. It displays reactivity characteristic of benzaldehyde and an aryl bromide.

== Preparation ==
4-Bromobenzaldehyde may be prepared in the laboratory in two steps by oxidation 4-bromotoluene. In the first step, two bromine atoms are added to the methyl group of 4-bromotoluene by free radical bromination to form 4-bromobenzal bromide. In the second step, the dibrominated methyl group is hydrolyzed with calcium carbonate, then steam distilled to collect 4-bromobenzaldehyde.

== Reactions ==
Owing to the bromoaryl group, 4-bromobenzaldehyde participates in various cross coupling reactions, such as Suzuki coupling. In a Sonogashira coupling it couples with trimethylsilylacetylene to form 4-((trimethylsilyl)ethynyl)benzaldehyde, precursor to 4-ethynylbenzaldehyde.
