= Iodobenzoic acid =

Iodobenzoic acids are any of three organic compounds with the formula IC_{6}H_{4}COOH, consisting of a carboxylic acid group and an iodine atom bonded to a central benzene ring. They can be considered as iodinated derivatives of benzoic acid, or as carboxylated variants of iodobenzene.

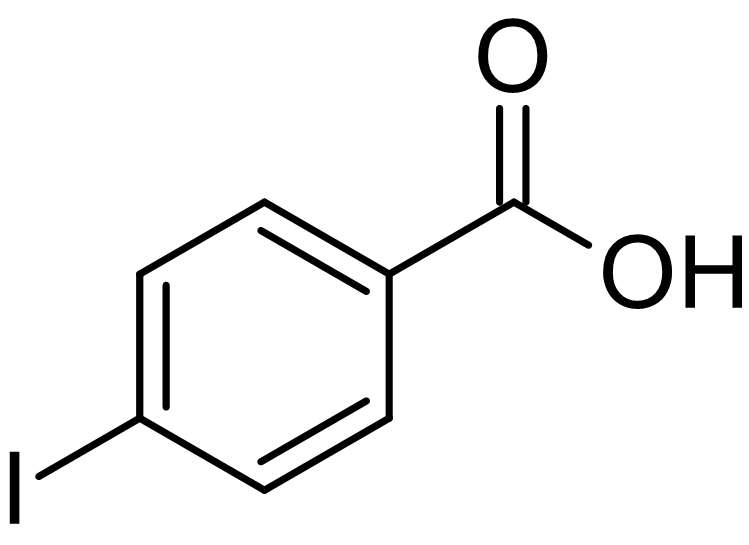
Iodobenzoic acid isomers
Common name and systematic name	2-Iodobenzoic acid	3-Iodobenzoic acid	4-Iodobenzoic acid
Structure
Molecular formula	C_{7}H_{5}IO_{2} (IC_{6}H_{4}COOH)
Molar mass	248.018 g/mol
Appearance	white solid	white solid	white solid
CAS number	[88-67-5]	[618-51-9]	[619-58-9]
Properties
Density and phase	2.25 g/ml, solid		2.18 g/ml, solid
Solubility in water	practically insoluble
Melting point	162 °C	185–187 °C	270–273 °C
