= Methyl 4-iodobenzoate =

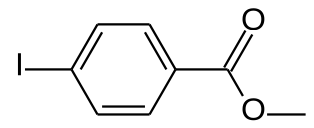

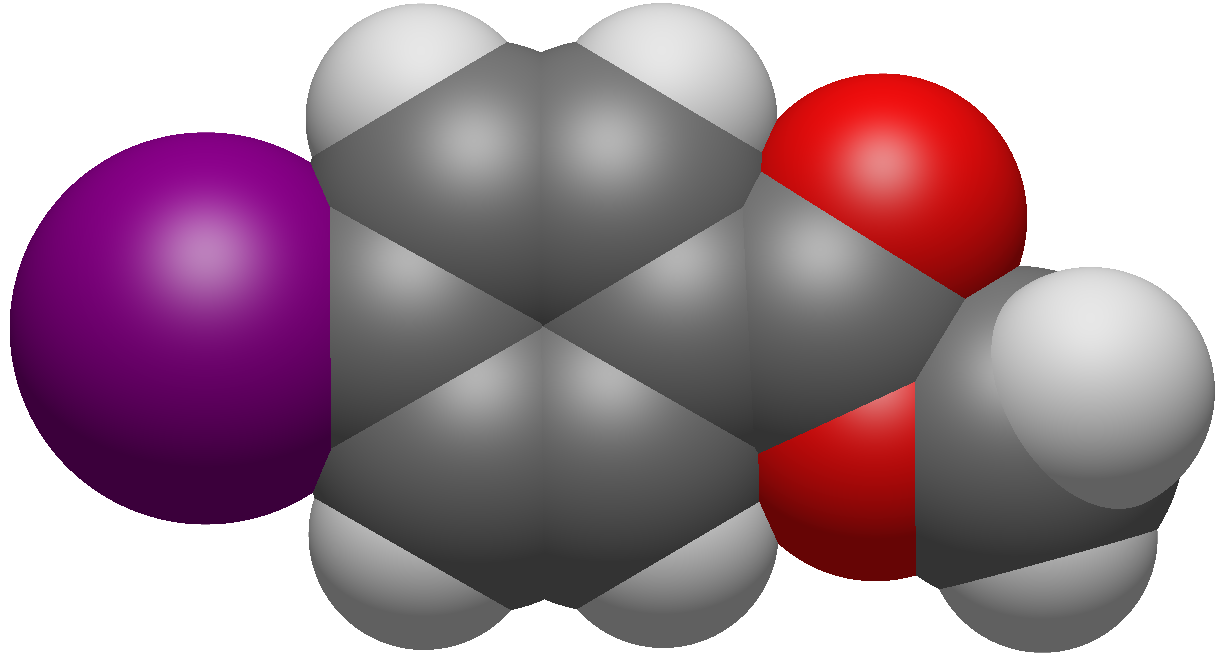

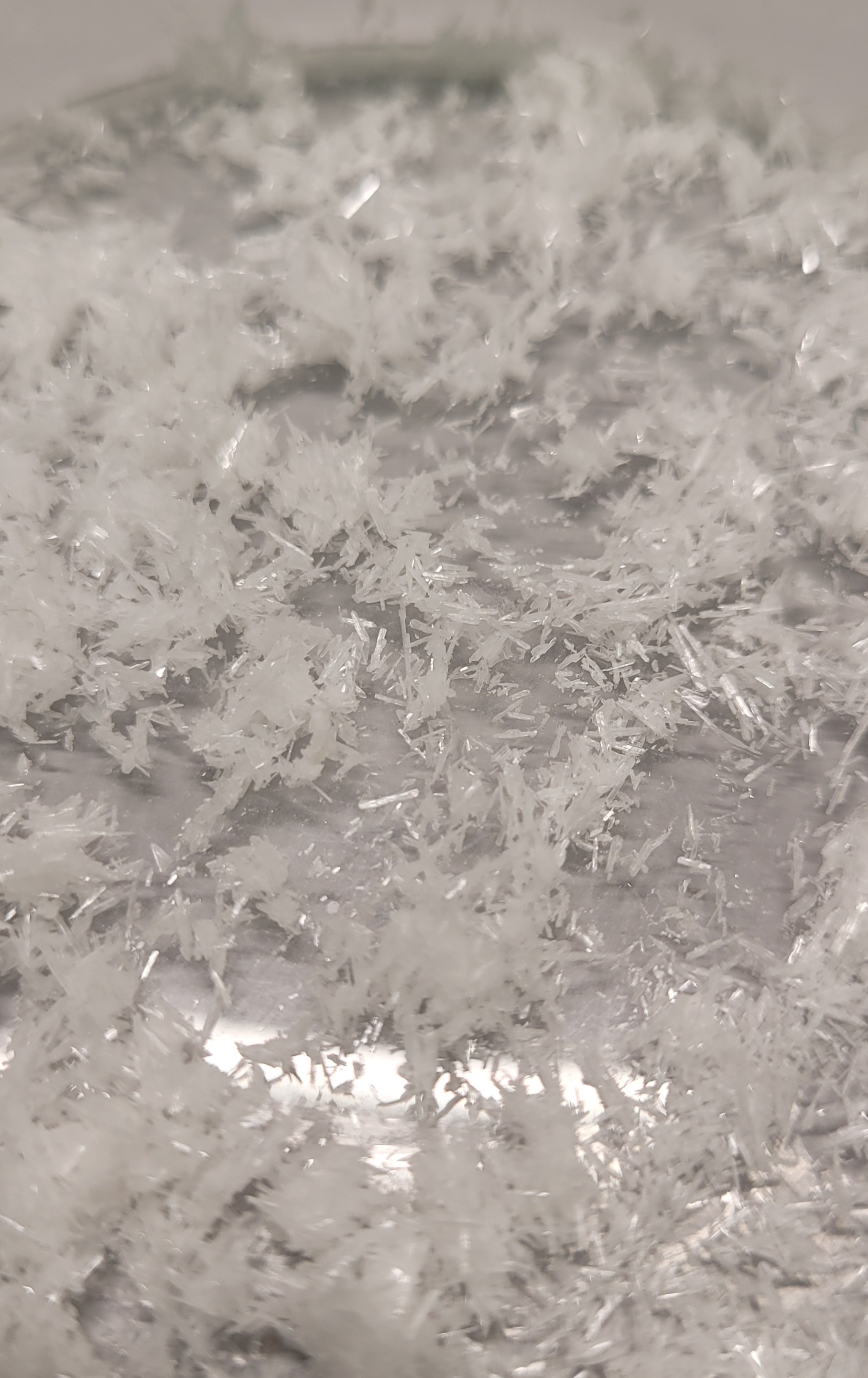

Names
- Preferred IUPAC name Methyl 4-iodobenzoate
- Other names Methyl p-iodobenzoate

Identifiers
CAS Number	619-44-3
3D model (JSmol)	Interactive image
ChemSpider	62484
ECHA InfoCard	100.009.635
EC Number	210-597-1
PubChem CID	69273
CompTox Dashboard (EPA)	DTXSID2060703
- InChI: InChI=1S/C8H7IO2/c1-11-8(10)6-2-4-7(9)5-3-6/h2-5H,1H3 Key: DYUWQWMXZHDZOR-UHFFFAOYSA-N
- SMILES: COC(=O)C1=CC=C(C=C1)I

Properties
Chemical formula	C_{8}H_{7}IO_{2}
Molar mass	262.046 g·mol^{−1}
Appearance	white solid
Melting point	114 °C (237 °F; 387 K)

Hazards
- GHS labelling
Pictograms	(GHS07: Exclamation mark) (GHS09: Environmental hazard)
Signal word	Warning
Hazard statements	H315, H319, H335, H411
Precautionary statements	P261, P264, P264+P265, P271, P273, P280, P302+P352, P304+P340, P305+P351+P338, P319, P321, P332+P317, P337+P317, P362+P364, P391, P403+P233, P405, P501
- Except where otherwise noted, data are given for materials in their standard state (at 25 °C [77 °F], 100 kPa). Infobox references

Methyl 4-iodobenzoate, or methyl p-iodobenzoate, is an organic compound with the formula IC_{6}H_{4}COOCH_{3}. It is the methyl ester of 4-iodobenzoic acid, or may also be viewed as an iodinated derivative of methyl benzoate.

== Preparation ==
Methyl 4-iodobenzoate may be prepared by the Fischer esterification of 4-iodobenzoic acid with methanol.

== Reactions ==
Dimethyl 4,4'-(ethyne-1,2-diyl)dibenzoate

The aryl-iodide functionality of methyl 4-iodobenzoate may undergo coupling reactions, such as a symmetrical Sonogashira coupling with trimethylsilylacetylene (with the TMSA deprotected to acetylene in situ) to form dimethyl 4,4'-(ethyne-1,2-diyl)dibenzoate.
