= Dehydration reaction =

Chemical reaction in which water is produced as a byproduct

In chemistry, a dehydration reaction is a chemical reaction that involves the loss of an H_{2}O from the reacting molecule(s) or ion(s). This reaction results in the release of the H_{2}O as water. When the reaction involves the coupling of two molecules into a single molecule it is referred to as a condensation reaction. Dehydration reactions are common processes in the manufacture of chemical compounds as well as naturally occurring within living organisms.

The reverse of a dehydration reaction is called a hydration reaction. The reverse of a condensation reaction yielding water is called hydrolysis.

== Condensation reactions occurring in living organisms ==
Condensation dehydration reactions are fundamental to the existence of life as this type of reaction produces proteins from amino acids, DNA and RNA from nucleotides, fats from fatty acids, and polysaccharides (e.g. cellulose, starch, sugar, lactose) from monosaccharides (e.g. glucose and fructose).

The formation of the pyrophosphate bond is an important dehydration reaction relevant to bioenergetics. Phosphorylation is a type of condensation dehydration reaction that is widely used to catalyze condensation reactions in living organisms. This phosphorylation usually involves the simultaneous dephosphorylation of ATP and therefore does not result in the release of H_{2}O.

These reactions are all mediated by enzymes.

== Condensation dehydration reactions in organic chemistry ==
=== Esterification ===
The classic example of a dehydration reaction is the Fischer esterification, which involves treating a carboxylic acid with an alcohol to give an ester

RCO_{2}H + R′OH ⇌ RCO_{2}R′ + H_{2}O

Often such reactions require the presence of a dehydrating agent, i.e. a substance that reacts with water.

=== Etherification ===
Two monosaccharides, such as glucose and fructose, can be joined (to form saccharose) using dehydration synthesis. The new molecule, consisting of two monosaccharides, is called a disaccharide.

== Dehydration reactions in organic chemistry resulting in unsaturated bonds ==
=== Nitrile formation ===
Nitriles are often prepared by dehydration of primary amides.

RC(O)NH_{2} → RCN + H_{2}O

=== Ketene formation ===
Ketene is produced by heating acetic acid and trapping the product:

CH_{3}C(O)OH → CH_{2}=C=O + H_{2}O

=== Alkene formation ===
Alkenes can be made from alcohols by dehydration. This conversion, among others, is used in converting biomass to liquid fuels. The conversion of ethanol to ethylene is a fundamental example:

CH_{3}CH_{2}OH → H_{2}C=CH_{2} + H_{2}O

The reaction is accelerated by acid catalysts such as sulfuric acid and certain zeolites. These reactions often proceed via carbocation intermediates as shown for the dehydration of cyclohexanol.

Some alcohols are prone to dehydration. 3-Hydroxylcarbonyls, called aldols, release water upon standing at room temperature:

RC(O)CH_{2}CH(OH)R' → RC(O)CH=CHR' + H_{2}O

The reaction is induced by dehydrating reagents. For example, 2-methyl-cyclohexan-1-ol dehydrates to 1-methylcyclohexene in the presence of Martin's sulfurane, which reacts irreversibly with water.

Double dehydration is illustrated by the conversion of glycerol to acrolein:

== Dehydration reactions in inorganic chemistry ==
Various construction materials are produced by dehydration. Plaster of Paris is produced by dehydration of gypsum in a kiln:

$\ce{CaSO4.2H2O +{}}$ heat $\ce{->}$ $\ce{CaSO4.1/2H2O + 1 1/2H2O}$ (released as steam).

The resulting dry powder is ready to be mixed with water to form a stiff but workable paste that hardens.
