= Dess–Martin periodinane =

Chemical reagent

- Chemical structure of the Dess–Martin periodinane

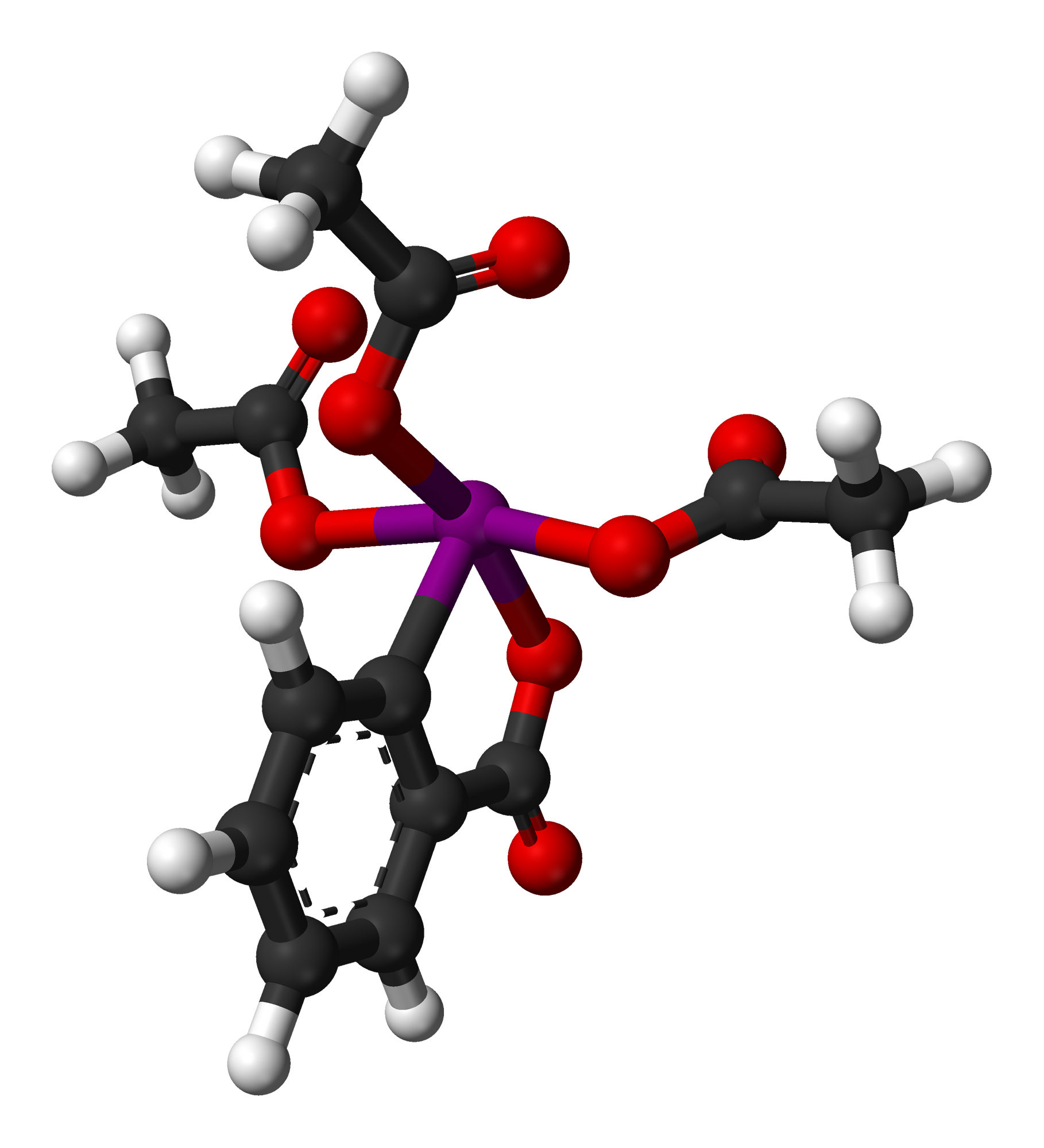
- Ball-and-stick model of the Dess–Martin periodinane

Names
- Preferred IUPAC name 3-Oxo-1λ^{5},2-benziodoxole-1,1,1(3H)-triyl triacetate
- Other names Dess–Martin periodinane

Identifiers
| CAS Number | 87413-09-0 |
| 3D model (JSmol) | Interactive image |
| ChemSpider | 139925 |
| ECHA InfoCard | 100.197.885 |
| PubChem CID | 159087 |
| UNII | 336B74JK56 |
| CompTox Dashboard (EPA) | DTXSID30236335 |
- InChI: InChI=1S/C13H13IO8/c1-8(15)19-14(20-9(2)16,21-10(3)17)12-7-5-4-6-11(12)13(18)22-14/h4-7H,1-3H3 Key: NKLCNNUWBJBICK-UHFFFAOYSA-N; InChI=1S/C13H13IO8/c1-8(15)19-14(20-9(2)16,21-10(3)17)12-7-5-4-6-11(12)13(18)22-14/h4-7H,1-3H3 Key: NKLCNNUWBJBICK-UHFFFAOYAQ
- SMILES: CC(=O)OI1(c2ccccc2C(=O)O1)(OC(=O)C)OC(=O)C

Properties
| Chemical formula | C_{13}H_{13}IO_{8} |
| Molar mass | 424.14 g/mol |
| Appearance | white powder, chips, crystals or crystalline powder and/or chunks |
| Density | 1.362 g/cm^{3} solid |
| Melting point | 103 to 133 °C (217 to 271 °F; 376 to 406 K) |

Related compounds
| Related compounds | 2-Iodoxybenzoic acid |
- Except where otherwise noted, data are given for materials in their standard state (at 25 °C [77 °F], 100 kPa). Infobox references

Dess–Martin periodinane (DMP) is a chemical reagent used in the Dess–Martin oxidation, oxidizing primary alcohols to aldehydes and secondary alcohols to ketones. This periodinane has several advantages over chromium- and DMSO-based oxidants that include milder conditions (room temperature, neutral pH), shorter reaction times, higher yields, simplified workups, high chemoselectivity, tolerance of sensitive functional groups, and a long shelf life. However, use on an industrial scale is made difficult by its cost and its potentially explosive nature. It is named after the American chemists Daniel Benjamin Dess and James Cullen Martin who developed the reagent in 1983. It is based on IBX, but due to the acetate groups attached to the central iodine atom, DMP is much more reactive than IBX and is much more soluble in organic solvents.

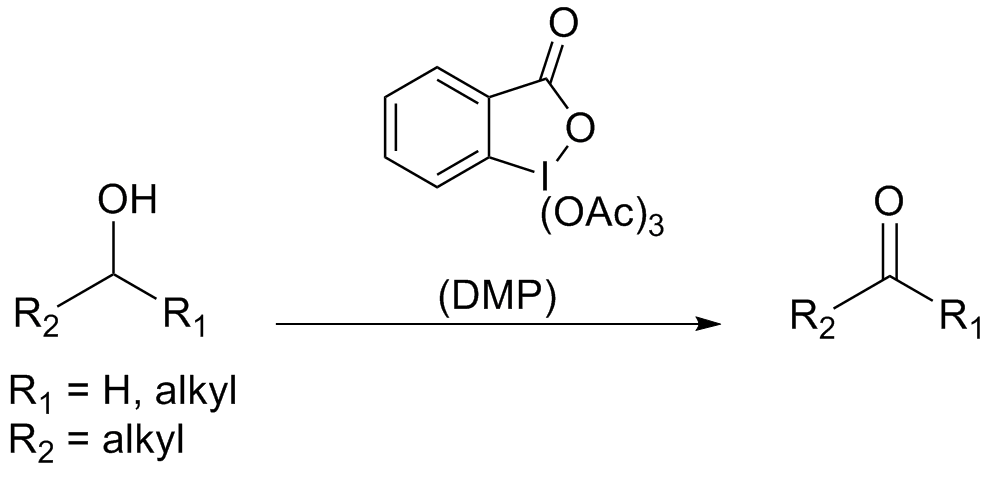
Reaction scheme

== Preparation ==
The most friendly synthesis of IBX has been determined to be treating 2-iodobenzoic acid with oxone in water, at elevated temperatures for 3 hours. IBX is then acylated using Ireland and Liu’s modifications from the original procedure. These modifications allowed for higher yields and a simplified work up procedure. The resulted solids can be obtained via filtration and washing with ether. Ireland and Liu used a catalytic amount of tosylic acid, which allowed the reaction to complete in less than 2 hours (compared to the classic synthesis, utilizing 24 hours) and in yields exceeding 90%.

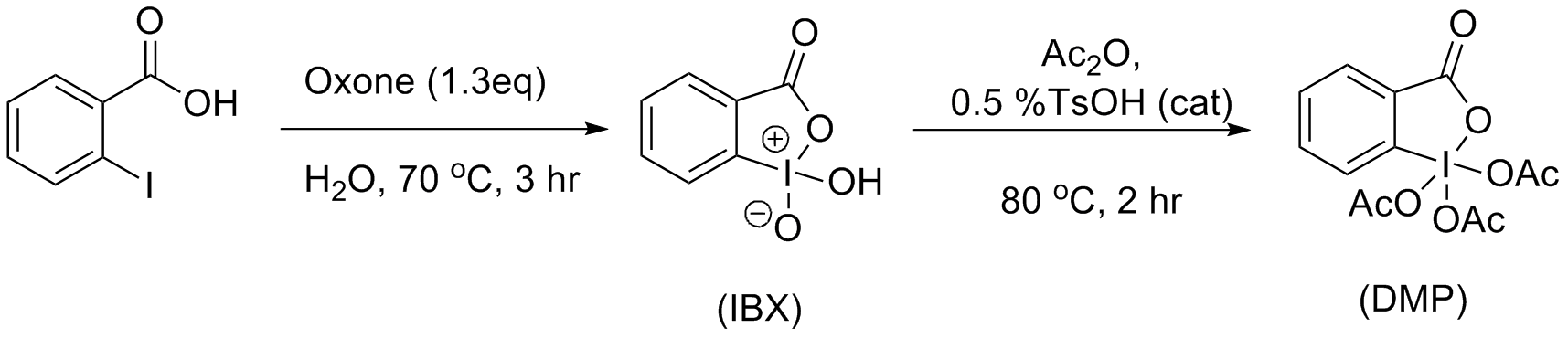
Preparation of DMP

The classic method presented by R. K. Boeckman and J. J. Mullins involved heating a solution of potassium bromate, sulfuric acid, 2-iodobenzoic acid to afford IBX (1-hydroxy-1,2-benziodoxol-3(1H)-one 1-oxide, 2-iodoxybenzoic acid). IBX was then acylated using acetic acid and acetic anhydride.

Classic production method

== Structure ==
DMP has square pyramidal geometry with 4 heteroatoms in basal positions and one apical phenyl group.

== Oxidation mechanism ==
Dess–Martin periodinane is mainly used as an oxidant for complex, sensitive and multifunctional alcohols. One of the reasons for its effectiveness is its high selectivity towards complexation of the hydroxyl group, which allows alcohols to rapidly perform ligand exchange; the first step in the oxidation reaction.

Proton NMR has indicated that using one equivalent of alcohol forms the intermediate diacetoxyalkoxyperiodinane. The acetate then acts as a base to deprotonate the α-H from the alcohol to afford the carbonyl compound, iodinane, and acetic acid.

When a diol or more than one equivalent of alcohol is used, acetoxydialkoxyperiodinane is formed instead. Due to the labile nature of this particular periodinane, oxidation occurs much faster.

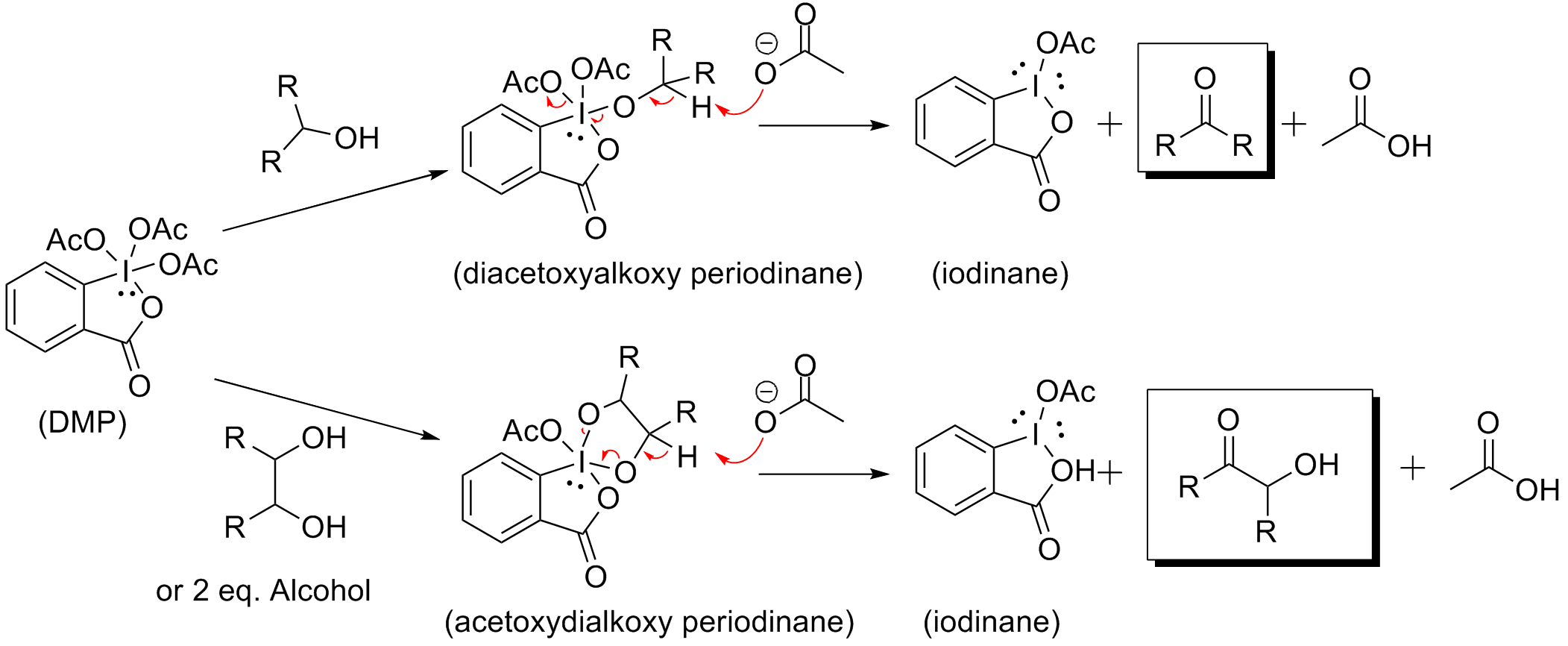
Oxidation by Dess-Martin-Periodinan

Schreiber and coworkers have shown that water increases the rate of the oxidation reaction. Dess and Martin had originally observed that the oxidation of ethanol was increased when there was an extra equivalent of ethanol. It is believed that the rate of dissociation of the final acetate ligand from the iodine is increased, because of the electron-donating ability of the hydroxyl group (thus weakening the I-OAc bond).

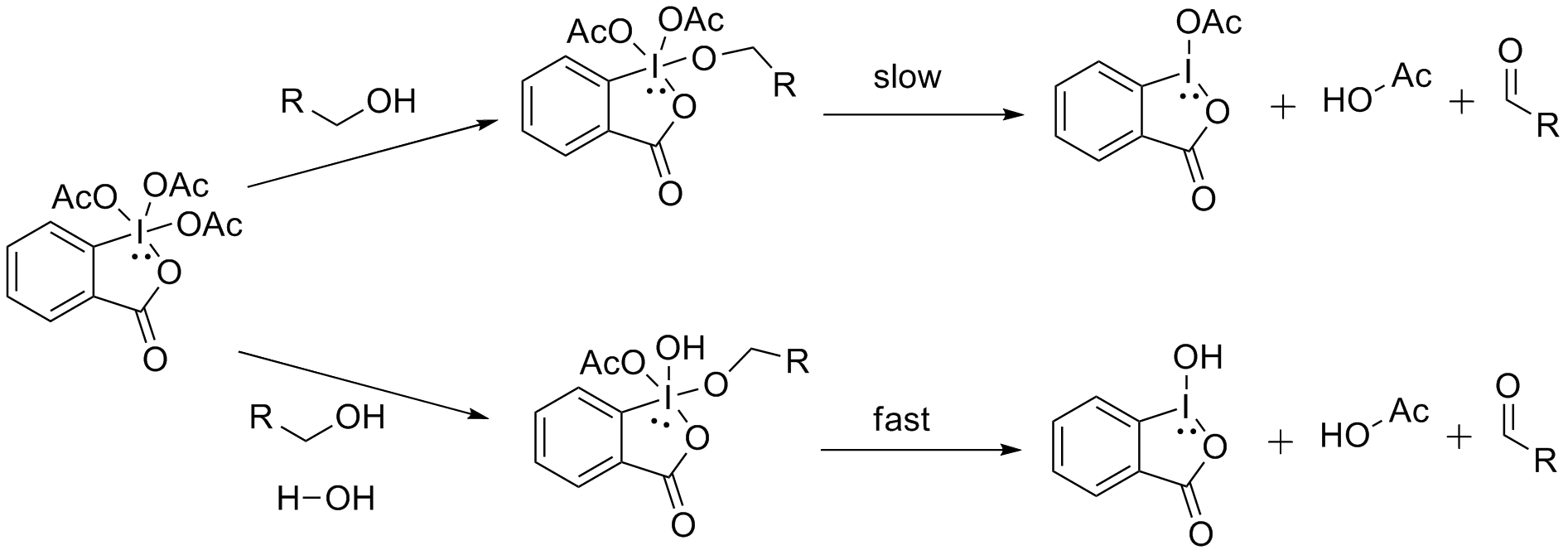
Water addition

=== Chemoselectivity ===
Using the standard Dess–Martin periodinane conditions, alcohols can be oxidized to aldehydes/ketones without affecting furan rings, sulfides, vinyl ethers, and secondary amides. Allylic alcohols are easily oxidized using DMP, which are typically difficult to convert to their respective carbonyls using the typical oxidants.

Myers and coworkers determined that DMP could oxidize N-protected-amino alcohols, without epimerization (unlike most other oxidants, including Swern oxidation). These protected amino alcohols can be very important in the pharmaceutical industry.

Benzylic and allylic alcohols react faster than saturated alcohols, while DMP oxidizes aldoximes and ketoximes to their respective aldehydes and ketones, faster than a primary, secondary or benzylic alcohol to its respective carbonyl.

One example of the Dess–Martin oxidation involves transforming a sensitive α-β-unsaturated alcohol to its corresponding aldehyde. This moiety has been found in several natural products and due to its high functionality, it could be a valuable synthetic building block in organic synthesis. Thongsornkleeb and Danheiser oxidized this sensitive alcohol by employing the Dess Martin Oxidation and altering the work up procedure (diluting with pentanes, washing with poly(4-vinylpyridine) to remove the acetic acid generated during the reaction, filtering and concentrating via distillation.

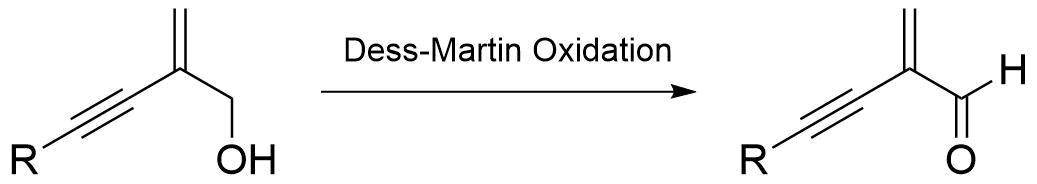

=== t-Butyl DMP ===
Difluoro and monofluoro alcohols are more difficult to oxidize. Swern oxidation has been used, but a large excess of the oxidant had to be employed, and in some cases did not give reproducible results. Linderman and Graves found DMP was successful in most cases but could not tolerate the presence of nucleophilic functional groups in the alcohol, as these reacted with DMP by displacing acetate. Using the compound shown below produced the desired carbonyls in high yields as the addition of the tert-butoxy group, due to its steric bulk, minimizes these side reactions.

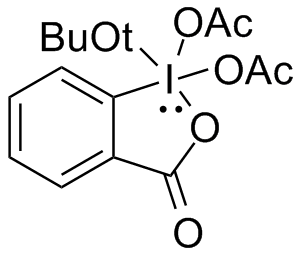
t-Butyl DMP

== See also ==
- Alcohol oxidation
- Pyridinium chlorochromate
- Jones oxidation
- Oppenauer oxidation
- Pfitzner–Moffatt oxidation
- Parikh–Doering oxidation
- Albright-Goldman oxidation
- Swern oxidation
- Corey–Kim oxidation
- Ley oxidation (TPAP oxidation)
- TEMPO oxidation
