= Bromotoluene =

Class of chemical compounds

Bromotoluenes are aryl bromides based on toluene in which at least one aromatic hydrogen atom is replaced with a bromine atom. They have the general formula C_{7}H_{8–n}Br_{n}, where n = 1–5 is the number of bromine atoms.

== Monobromotoluene ==
Monobromotoluenes are bromotoluenes containing one bromine atom. There are three isomers, each with the formula C_{7}H_{7}Br.

=== Properties ===
The isomers differ in the location of the bromine, but have the same chemical formula.

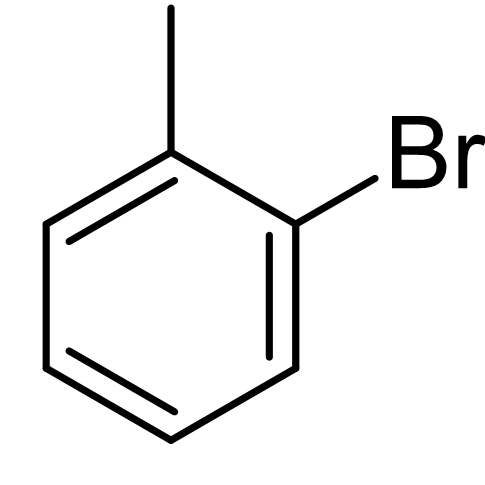
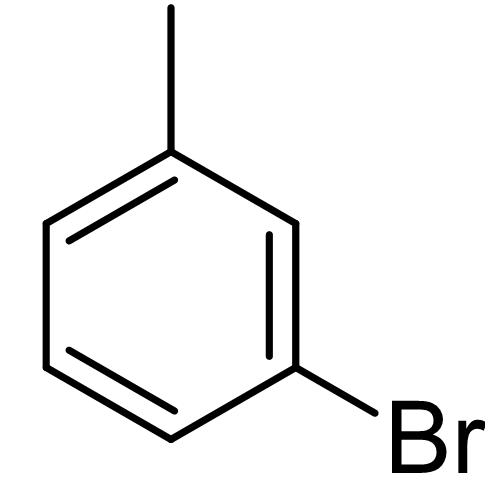
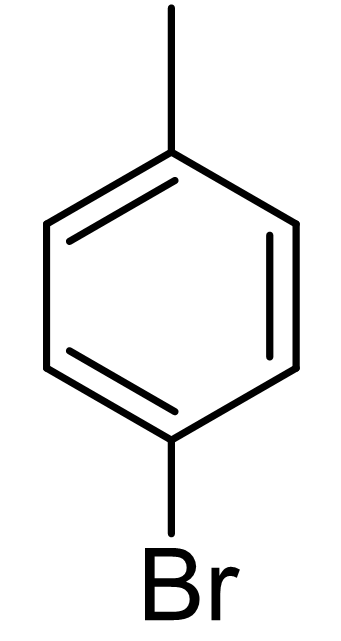
Monobromotoluene isomers
Common name	o-bromotoluene	m-bromotoluene	p-bromotoluene
Structure
Systematic name	1-bromo-2-methylbenzene	1-bromo-3-methylbenzene	1-bromo-4-methylbenzene
Molecular formula	C_{7}H_{7}Br (C_{6}H_{4}BrCH_{3})
Molar mass	171.03 g/mol
Appearance	colorless liquid	colorless liquid	white crystalline solid
CAS number	[95-46-5]	[591-17-3]	[106-38-7]
Properties
Density and phase	1.431 g/ml, liquid	1.4099 g/ml, liquid	1.3995 g/ml, solid
Solubility in water	practically insoluble
Other solubilities	very soluble in ethanol, ether, benzene, carbon tetrachloride, acetone, chloroform
Melting point	−27.8 °C (−18.0 °F; 245.35 K)	−39.8 °C (−39.6 °F; 233.35 K)	28.5 °C (83.3 °F; 301.7 K)
Boiling point	181.7 °C (359.1 °F; 454.9 K)	183.7 °C (362.7 °F; 456.9 K)	184.5 °C (364.1 °F; 457.7 K)

Benzyl bromide is an isomer, which has a bromine substituted for one of the hydrogens of toluene's methyl group, and it is sometimes named α-bromotoluene.

== Preparation ==
A laboratory route to p-bromotoluene proceeds from p-toluidine, which is diazotiized followed by treatment with copper(I) bromide.

== Uses ==
Bromotoluenes are precursors to many organic building blocks. For example, the methyl group may be oxidized using potassium permanganate to form the corresponding bromobenzoic acid. The methyl group may also be partially oxidized to form bromobenzaldehyde.

== See also ==
- Chlorotoluene
- Iodotoluene
