= 3-Bromobenzaldehyde =

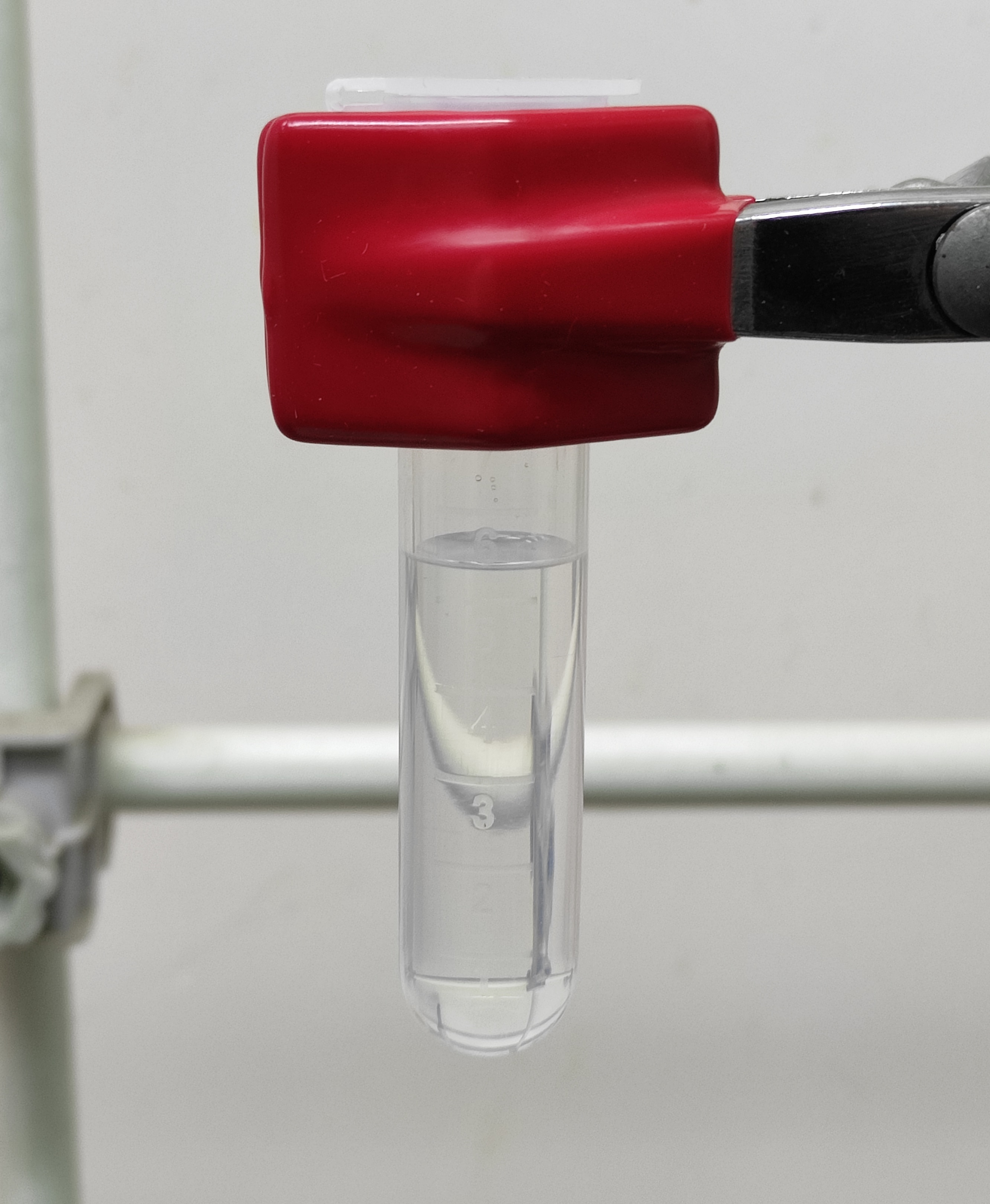

Names
- Preferred IUPAC name 3-Bromobenzaldehyde

Identifiers
CAS Number	3132-99-8
3D model (JSmol)	Interactive image
ChEMBL	ChEMBL1568619
ChemSpider	21106543
ECHA InfoCard	100.019.570
EC Number	221-526-9
PubChem CID	76583
UNII	W0ARD2ZJ82
CompTox Dashboard (EPA)	DTXSID4027521
- InChI: InChI=1S/C7H5BrO/c8-7-3-1-2-6(4-7)5-9/h1-5H Key: SUISZCALMBHJQX-UHFFFAOYSA-N; InChI=1/C7H5BrO/c8-7-3-1-2-6(4-7)5-9/h1-5H Key: SUISZCALMBHJQX-UHFFFAOYAJ
- SMILES: C1=CC(=CC(=C1)Br)C=O

Properties
Chemical formula	C_{7}H_{5}BrO
Molar mass	185.020 g·mol^{−1}
Appearance	colorless liquid.
Density	1.587 g/mL
Melting point	18 to 21 °C (64 to 70 °F; 291 to 294 K)
Boiling point	233 to 236 °C (451 to 457 °F; 506 to 509 K)

Hazards
- GHS labelling
Pictograms	(GHS07: Exclamation mark)
Signal word	Warning
Hazard statements	H302, H315, H319, H335
Precautionary statements	P261, P264, P270, P271, P280, P301+P312, P302+P352, P304+P340, P305+P351+P338, P312, P321, P330, P332+P313, P337+P313, P362, P403+P233, P405, P501

Related compounds
Related compounds	4-Bromobenzaldehyde
- Except where otherwise noted, data are given for materials in their standard state (at 25 °C [77 °F], 100 kPa). Infobox references

3-Bromobenzaldehyde is an isomer of bromobenzaldehyde. It is a colorless viscous liquid.

== Synthesis ==
3-Bromobenzaldehyde can be prepared from 3-nitrobenzaldehyde.

To 1,2-dichloroethane (1,2-dichloroethane: 143.8 g, 1-bromo-2-chloroethane: 60.5 g, 1,2-dibromoethane: 4.8 g) recovered from Example 2 was added fresh 1,2-dichloroethane (41.5 g), and 98% aluminum chloride (0.65 mol, 88.6 g) was mixed. Into this was blown chlorine (0.25 mol, 17.8 g) at °C., and 97% benzaldehyde (0.50 mol, 54.6 g) was added over 1 hour at 40 °C. After bromine (0.30 mol, 48.0 g) was added dropwise to this mixture over 2 hours at 40 °C., the resulting mixtures were stirred for 2 hours at that temperature. The post-treatment was carried out by the similar procedure to that in Example 1. As a result, 83.1 g of 3-bromobenzaldehyde were obtained.

Patents:

== Application ==
SNDRI Application patent (PC9839278):

== See also ==
- 4-Bromobenzaldehyde
