= 4-Iodobenzoic acid =

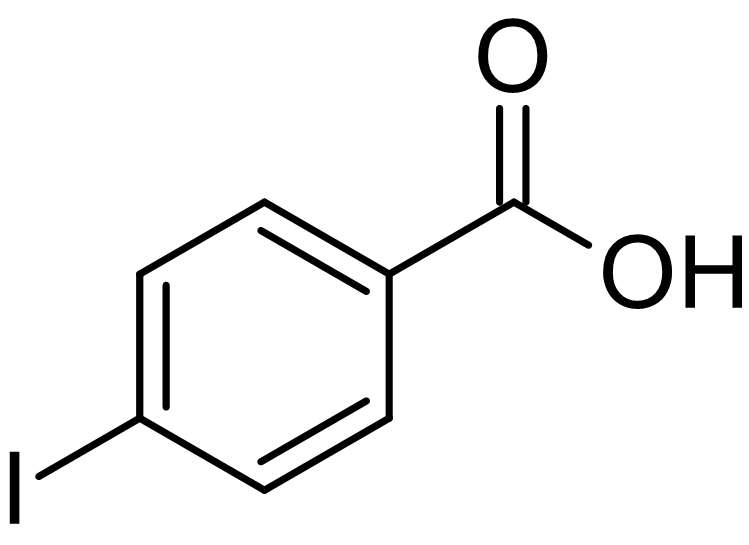

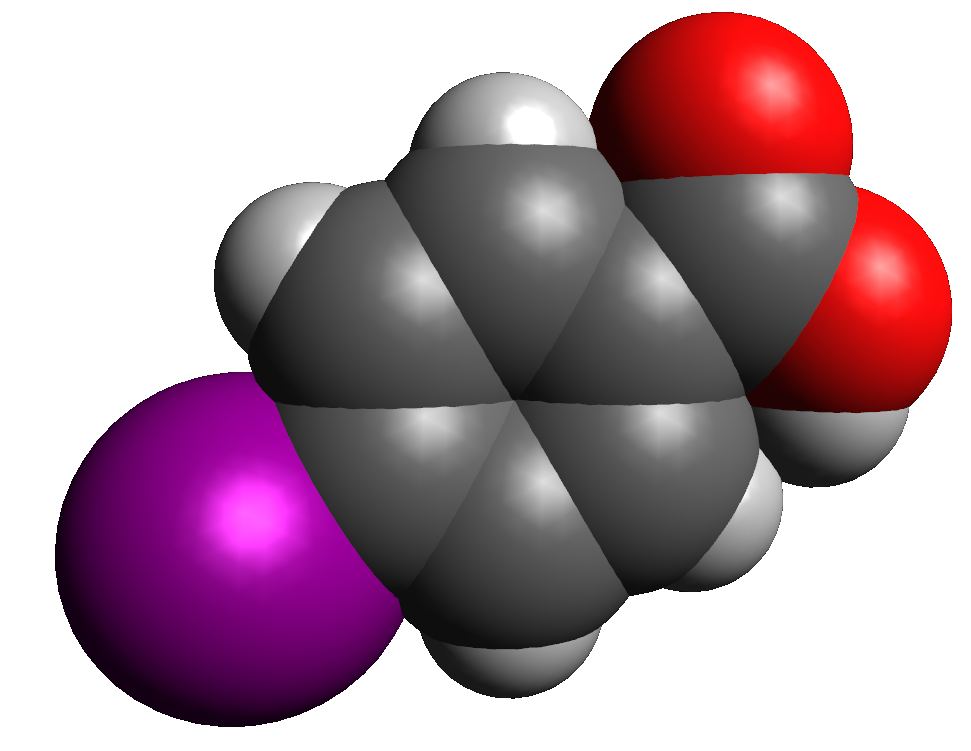

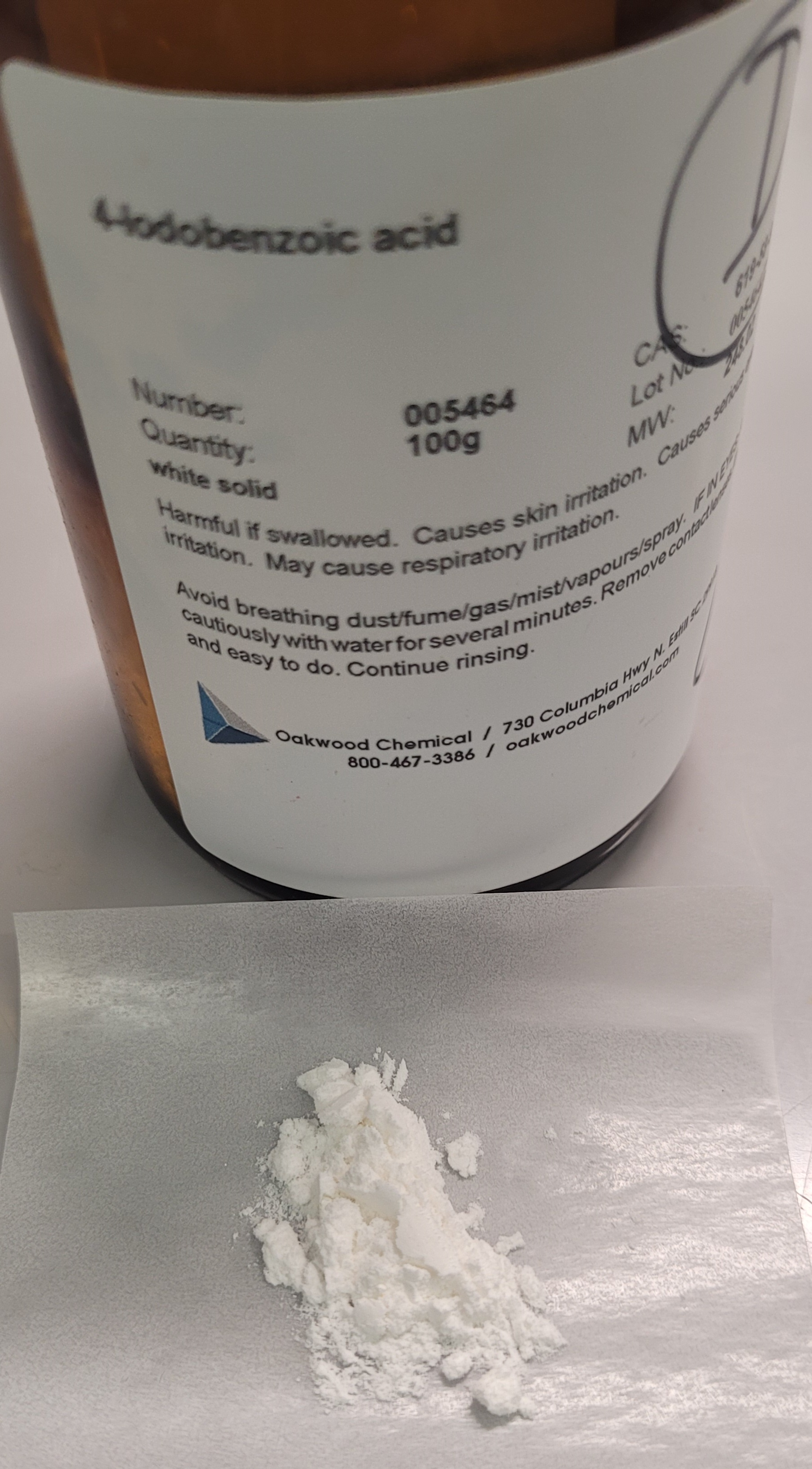

Names
- Preferred IUPAC name 4-Iodobenzoic acid
- Other names p-Iodobenzoic acid

Identifiers
CAS Number	619-58-9
3D model (JSmol)	Interactive image
ChEMBL	ChEMBL101265
ChemSpider	11588
ECHA InfoCard	100.009.641
EC Number	210-603-2
PubChem CID	12085
UNII	IPO4LYQ1EN
CompTox Dashboard (EPA)	DTXSID20862304
- InChI: InChI=1S/C7H5IO2/c8-6-3-1-5(2-4-6)7(9)10/h1-4H,(H,9,10) Key: GHICCUXQJBDNRN-UHFFFAOYSA-N
- SMILES: C1=CC(=CC=C1C(=O)O)I

Properties
Chemical formula	C_{7}H_{5}IO_{2}
Molar mass	248.019 g·mol^{−1}
Appearance	white solid
Density	2.18 g/cm^{3}
Melting point	270–273 °C (518–523 °F; 543–546 K)

Hazards
- GHS labelling
Pictograms	(GHS07: Exclamation mark)
Signal word	Warning
Hazard statements	H315, H319, H335
Precautionary statements	P261, P264, P264+P265, P271, P280, P302+P352, P304+P340, P305+P351+P338, P319, P321, P332+P317, P337+P317, P362+P364, P403+P233, P405, P501
- Except where otherwise noted, data are given for materials in their standard state (at 25 °C [77 °F], 100 kPa). verify (what is ?) Infobox references

4-Iodobenzoic acid, or p-iodobenzoic acid, is an isomer of iodobenzoic acid.

== Structure ==
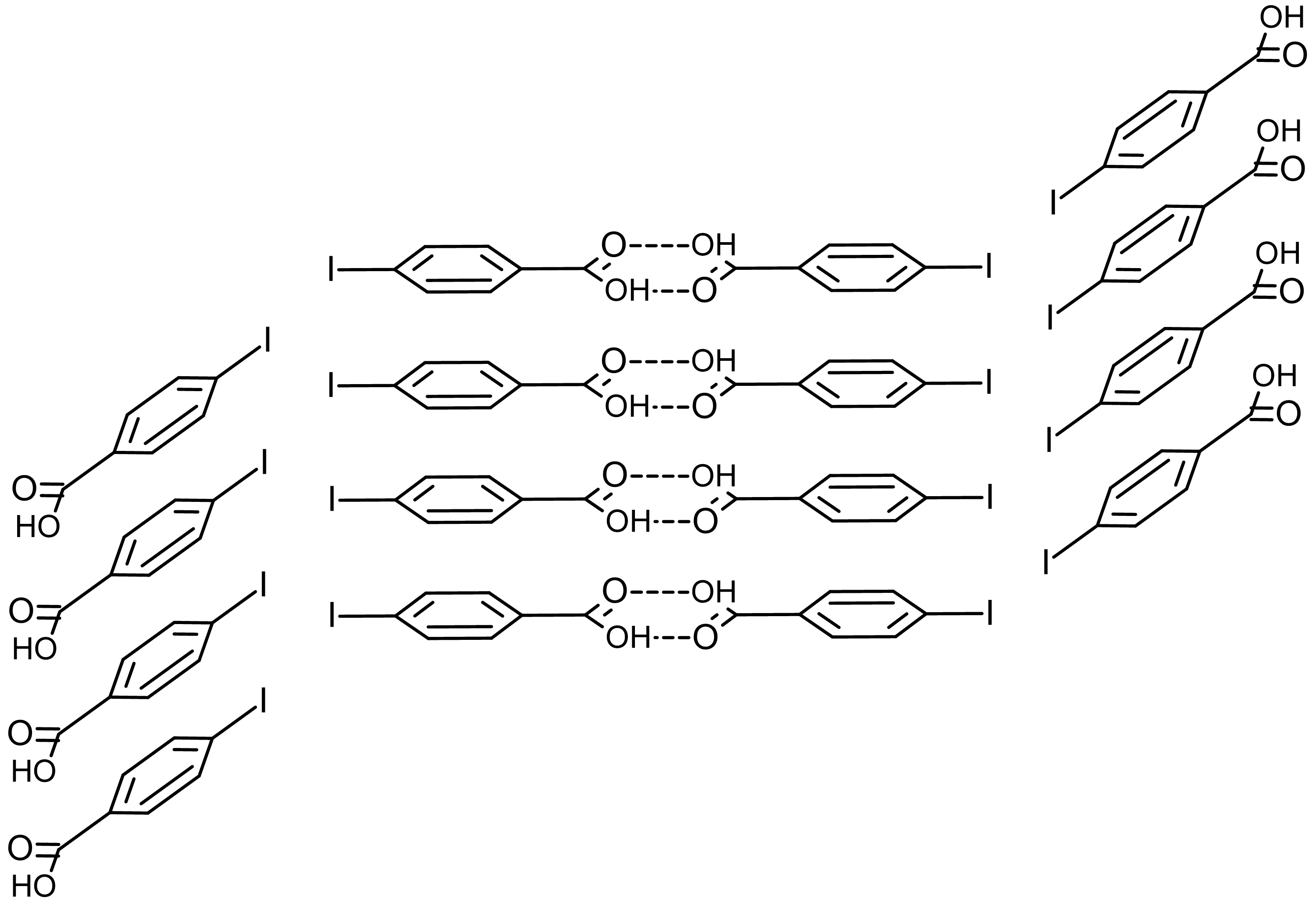
4-iodobenzoic acid crystallization

X-ray crystallography of 4-iodobenzoic acid has shown that it crystallizes in the solid state as hydrogen-bonded dimers which stack perpendicular to their aromatic rings. The iodine atoms of adjacent dimers are also oriented towards each other due to van der Waals forces.

== Preparation ==
4-Iodobenzoic acid may be prepared in the laboratory by the oxidation of p-iodotoluene with potassium permanganate.

== Reactions ==
The carboxylic acid functionality of 4-iodobenzoic acid undergoes Fischer–Speier esterification with methanol to form the ester methyl 4-iodobenzoate.
