= 2-Iodoxybenzoic acid =

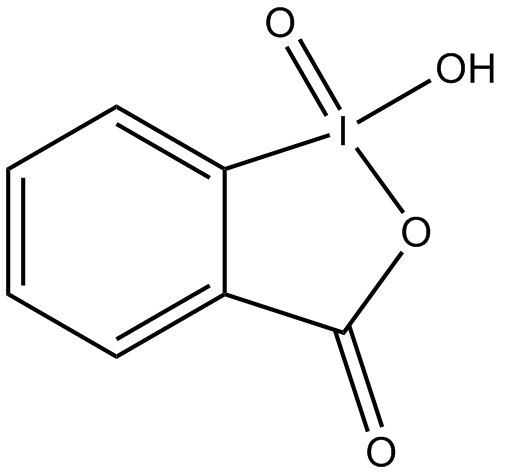

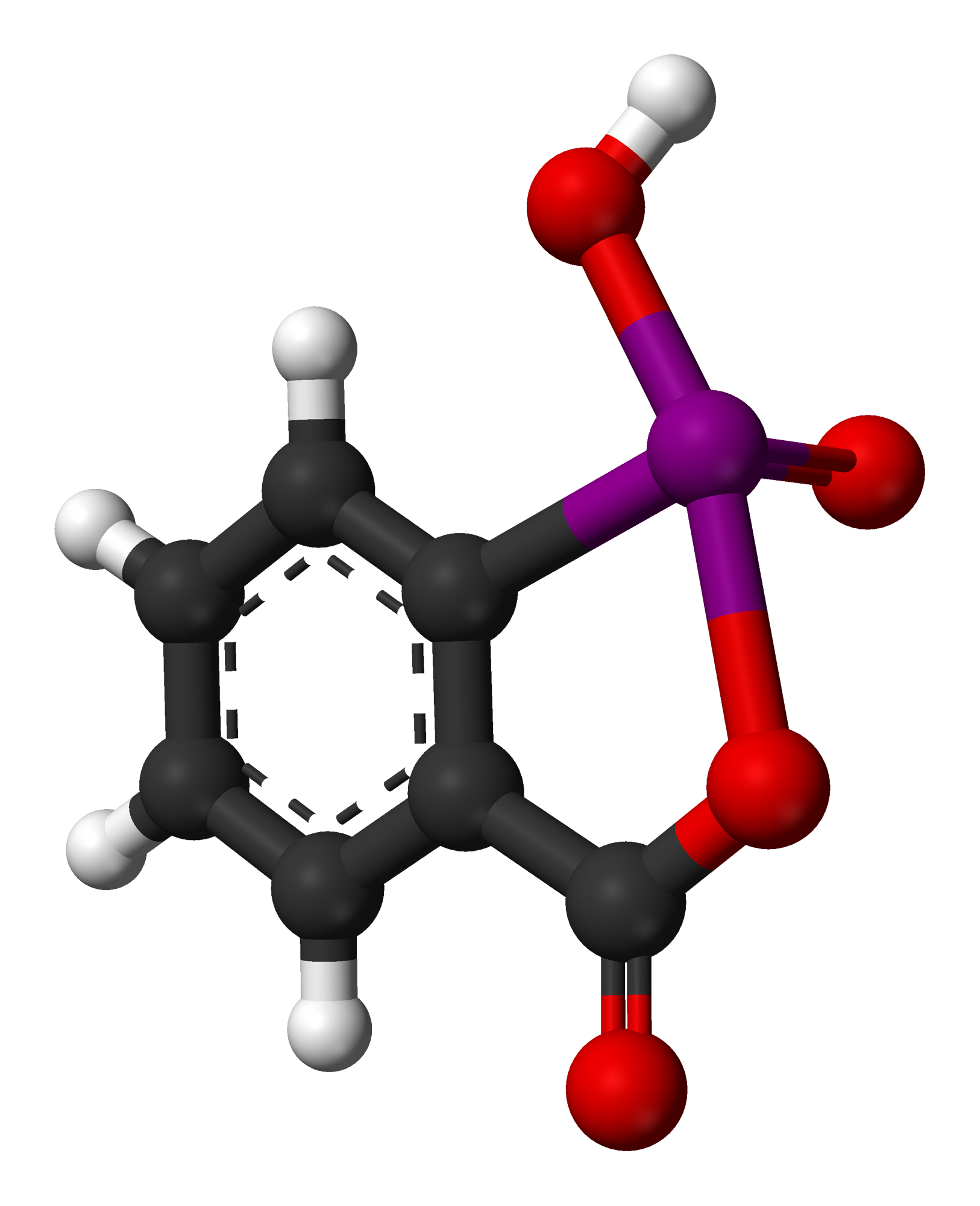

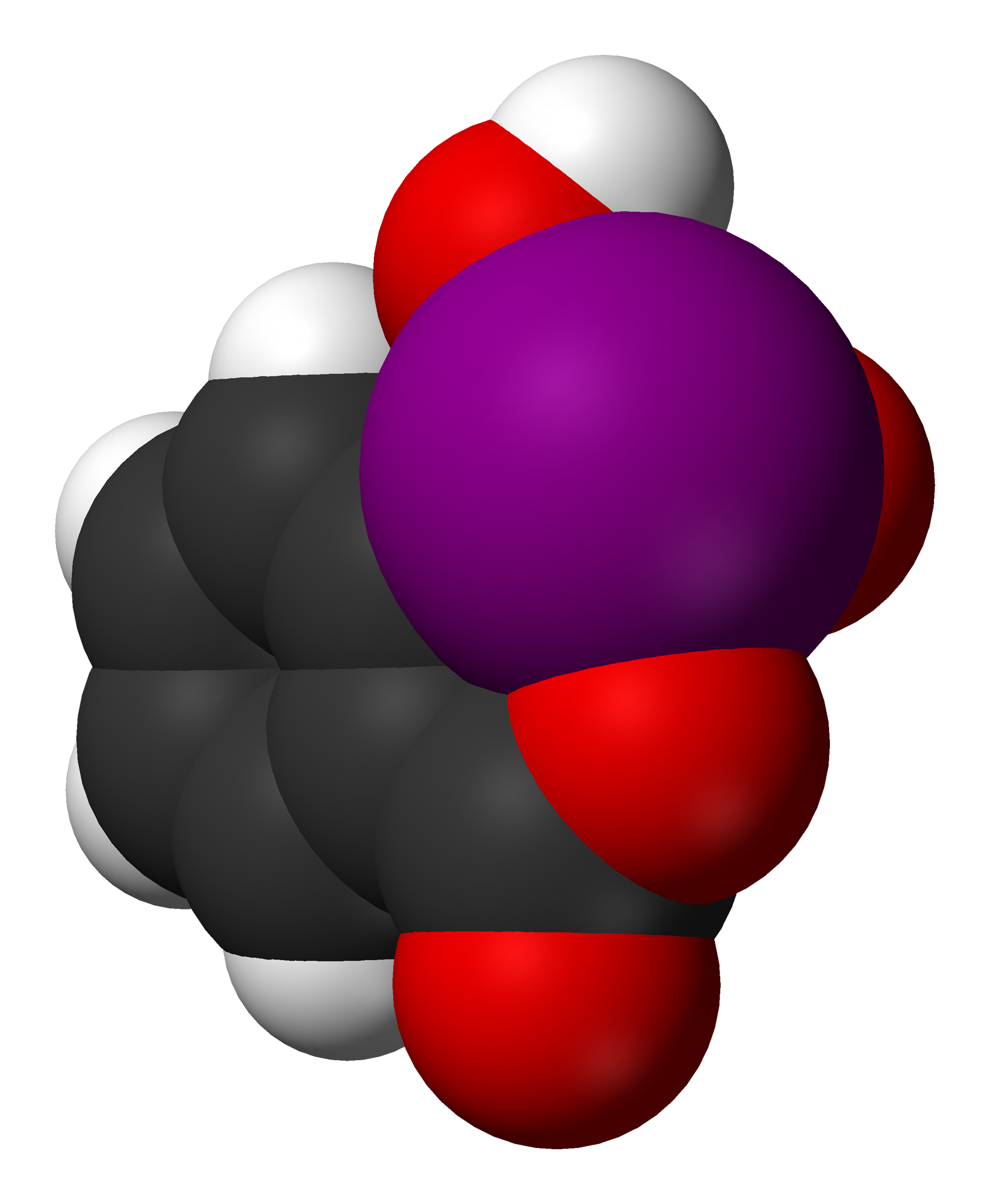

Names
- Preferred IUPAC name 1-Hydroxy-1λ^{5},2-benziodoxole-1,3-dione
- Other names 1-Hydroxy-1λ^{3},2-benziodoxol-3(1H)-one 1-oxide

Identifiers
CAS Number	61717-82-6
3D model (JSmol)	Interactive image; Interactive image
Beilstein Reference	976364
ChEBI	CHEBI:52701
ChEMBL	ChEMBL118857
ChemSpider	300947
ECHA InfoCard	100.157.592
PubChem CID	339496
UNII	3K0C43POH0
CompTox Dashboard (EPA)	DTXSID00210723
- InChI: InChI=1S/C7H5IO4/c9-7-5-3-1-2-4-6(5)8(10,11)12-7/h1-4H,(H,10,11) Key: CQMJEZQEVXQEJB-UHFFFAOYSA-N; InChI=1/C7H5IO4/c9-7-5-3-1-2-4-6(5)8(10,11)12-7/h1-4H,(H,10,11) Key: CQMJEZQEVXQEJB-UHFFFAOYAL
- SMILES: O=C1OI(=O)(O)c2ccccc12; c1ccc2c(c1)C(=O)OI2(=O)O

Properties
Chemical formula	C_{7}H_{5}IO_{4}
Molar mass	280.017 g·mol^{−1}
Melting point	233 °C (decomposes)

Hazards
- GHS labelling
Pictograms	(GHS05: Corrosive) (GHS07: Exclamation mark)
Signal word	Danger
Hazard statements	H314, H315, H319, H335
Precautionary statements	P260, P264, P271, P280, P301+P330+P331, P302+P352, P303+P361+P353, P304+P340, P305+P351+P338, P310, P312, P321, P332+P313, P337+P313, P362, P363, P403+P233, P405, P501
- Except where otherwise noted, data are given for materials in their standard state (at 25 °C [77 °F], 100 kPa). verify (what is ?) Infobox references

2-Iodoxybenzoic acid (IBX) is an organic compound used in organic synthesis as an oxidizing agent. This periodinane is especially suited to oxidize alcohols to aldehydes. IBX is most often prepared from 2-iodobenzoic acid and a strong oxidant such as potassium bromate and sulfuric acid, or more commonly, oxone. One of the main drawbacks of IBX is its limited solubility; IBX is insoluble in many common organic solvents. IBX is an impact- and heat-sensitive explosive (>200°C). Commercial IBX is stabilized by carboxylic acids such as benzoic acid and isophthalic acid.

== Preparation ==
IBX can be prepared in a single step by adding an excess of oxone to an aqueous solution of 2-iodobenzoic acid. After warming the solution to 70°C for three hours, the precipitated IBX is collected as a white crystalline solid (80% yield, ≥95% purity). Decomposition of IBX to 2-iodosobenzoic acid and 2-iodobenzoic acid occurs at elevated temperatures, and therefore purification by recrystallization from water is not possible. Purity can be increased (≥99%) by shorting the reaction time to one hour at 70°C, at the cost of slightly reducing yield to 77%.

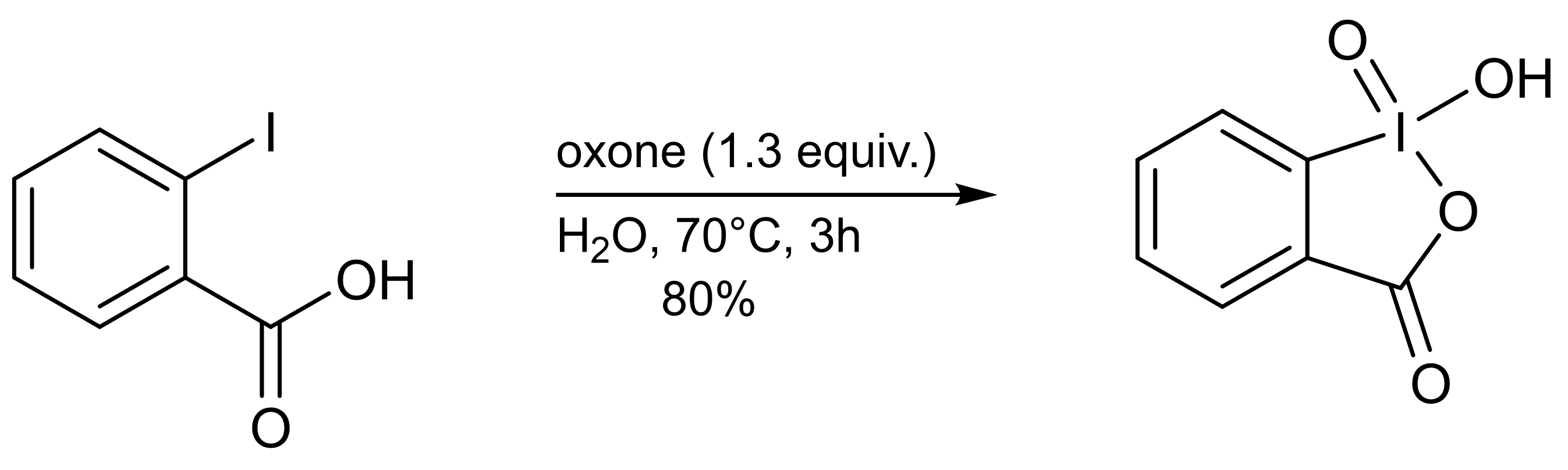
IBX Preparation from 2-iodobenzoic acid and Oxone.

== Reaction mechanism ==
The reaction mechanism for an oxidation of an alcohol to an aldehyde according to the hypervalent twisting mechanism involves a ligand exchange reaction replacing the hydroxyl group by the alcohol followed by a twist and an elimination reaction. The twist is a requirement because the iodine to oxygen double bond is oriented out of plane with the alkoxy group and the concerted elimination would not be able to take place. This twist reaction is a rearrangement in which the oxygen atom is moved into a proper plane for a 5 membered cyclic transition state in the elimination reaction and is calculated by Computational chemistry to be the rate-determining step in the oxidation. The twist mechanism also explains why oxidation is faster for larger alcohols than for small alcohols. The twist is driven forward by the steric hindrance that exists between the ortho hydrogen atom and the protons from the alkoxy group and larger alkoxy groups create larger steric repulsion. The same computation predicts a much faster reacting IBX derivative with a 100 fold reaction rate when this ortho hydrogen atom is replaced by a methyl group thus facilitating the twist until the elimination reaction takes prevalence as the rate determining step.

The hypervalent twisting mechanism during conversion of methanol to formaldehyde: a) ligand exchange reaction (activation energy 9.1 kcal/mol (38 kJ/mol), b) hypervalent twist 12.1 kcal/mol (51 kJ/mol), c) elimination 4.7 kcal/mol (20 kJ/mol)).

IBX exists as two tautomers, one of which is the carboxylic acid. The acidity of IBX which has been determined in water (pKa 2.4) and DMSO (pKa 6.65) is known to affect organic reactions, for instance acid-catalyzed isomerization accompanying oxidations.

== Scope ==
IBX is also available as silica gel or polystyrene bound IBX. In many applications, IBX is replaced by Dess–Martin periodinane which is more soluble in common organic solvents. A sample reaction is an IBX oxidation used in the total synthesis of eicosanoid: More and Finney and Van Arman have demonstrated that common organic solvents are suitable for many IBX oxidations, despite its low solubility, and in fact may simplify product purification.

IBX oxidation of alcohol to aldehyde, 94% chemical yield (Mohapatra, 2005)

In 2001, K. C. Nicolaou and co-workers published a series of papers in the Journal of the American Chemical Society demonstrating, among other transformations, the use of IBX to oxidize primary and secondary benzylic carbons to aromatic aldehydes and ketones, respectively. The presence of additional water in the solution is now considered to be an essential part of those oxidations.

=== Oxidative cleavage ===
IBX is notable for oxidizing vicinal diols (or glycols) to diketones without cleavage of the carbon-carbon bond, but oxidative cleavage of glycols to two aldehydes or ketones can occur when modified conditions are used (elevated temperatures or trifluoroacetic acid solvent).

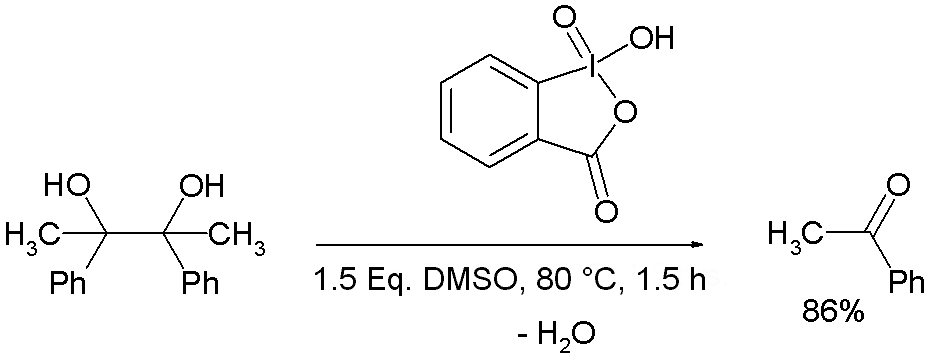

The reaction mechanism for this glycol cleavage is based on initial formation of an adduct between 10-I-4 IBX and DMSO to a 12-I-5 intermediate 3 in which DMSO acts as a leaving group for incoming alcohol 4 to intermediate 5. One equivalent of water is split off forming 12-I-5 spirobicyclic periodinane 6 setting the stage for fragmentation to 7. With hydroxyl alpha protons present, oxidation to the acyloin competes. Trifluoroacetic acid is found to facilitate the overall reaction.

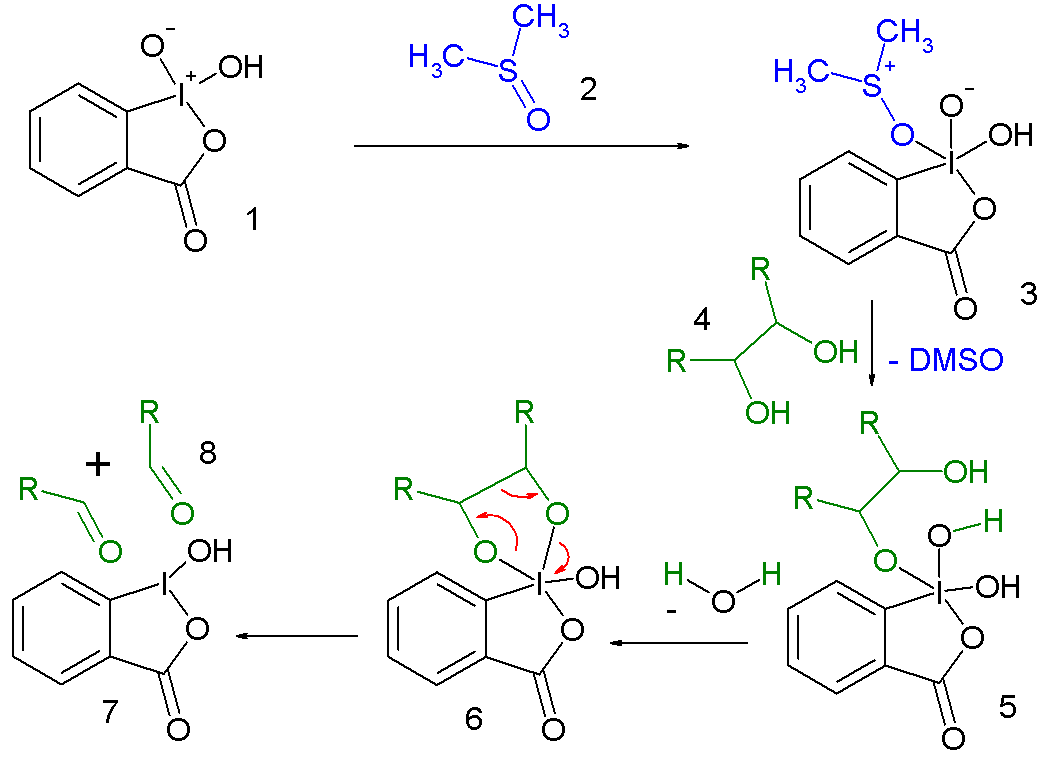

=== α-Hydroxylations ===
Kirsch and co-workers were able to hydroxylate keto compounds with IBX in α-position under mild conditions. This method could be extended to β-keto esters, and forms a regioselective way to introduce conjugatively activated unsaturation.

=== Oxidation of β-hydroxyketones to β-diketones ===
Bartlett and Beaudry discovered that IBX is a valuable reagent for the transformation of β-hydroxyketones to β-diketones. IBX provides yields superior to both the Swern and Dess–Martin oxidation protocols.
