= Martin's sulfurane =

Names
- Preferred IUPAC name Bis[(1,1,1,3,3,3-hexafluoro-2-phenylpropan-2-yl)oxy]diphenyl-λ^{4}-sulfane

Identifiers
CAS Number	32133-82-7
3D model (JSmol)	Interactive image
ChemSpider	2843600
ECHA InfoCard	100.156.587
EC Number	628-306-5
PubChem CID	3608068
UNII	F9631K90E5
CompTox Dashboard (EPA)	DTXSID90394127
- InChI: InChI=1S/C30H20F12O2S/c31-27(32,33)25(28(34,35)36,21-13-5-1-6-14-21)43-45(23-17-9-3-10-18-23,24-19-11-4-12-20-24)44-26(29(37,38)39,30(40,41)42)22-15-7-2-8-16-22/h1-20H Key: RMIBJVUYNZSLSD-UHFFFAOYSA-N
- SMILES: C1=CC=C(C=C1)C(C(F)(F)F)(C(F)(F)F)OS(C2=CC=CC=C2)(C3=CC=CC=C3)OC(C4=CC=CC=C4)(C(F)(F)F)C(F)(F)F

Properties
Chemical formula	C_{30}H_{20}F_{12}O_{2}S
Molar mass	672.53 g·mol^{−1}
Appearance	white solid
Melting point	107–109 °C (225–228 °F; 380–382 K)

Hazards
- GHS labelling
Pictograms	(GHS05: Corrosive)
Signal word	Danger
Hazard statements	H314
Precautionary statements	P260, P264, P280, P301+P330+P331, P303+P361+P353, P304+P340, P305+P351+P338, P310, P321, P363, P405, P501
- Except where otherwise noted, data are given for materials in their standard state (at 25 °C [77 °F], 100 kPa). Infobox references

Martin's sulfurane is the organosulfur compound with the formula Ph_{2}S[OC(CF_{3})_{2}Ph]_{2} (Ph = C_{6}H_{5}). It is a white solid that easily undergoes sublimation. The compound is an example of a hypervalent sulfur compound called a sulfurane. As such, the sulfur adopts a see-saw structure, with a lone pair of electrons as the equatorial fifth coordinate of a trigonal bipyramid, like that of sulfur tetrafluoride (SF_{4}). The compound is a reagent in organic synthesis. One application is for the dehydration of a secondary alcohol to give an alkene:

RCH(OH)CH_{2}R' + Ph_{2}S[OC(CF_{3})_{2}Ph]_{2} → RCH=CHR' + Ph_{2}SO + 2 HOC(CF_{3})_{2}Ph

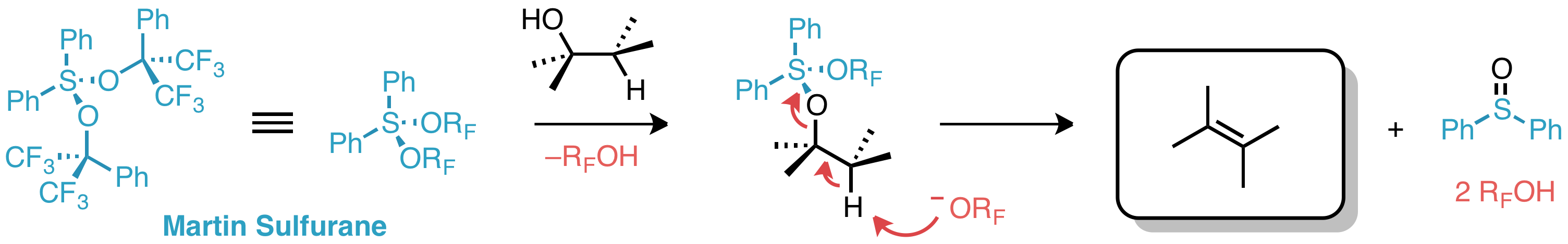
Mechanism of the dehydration using Martin's sulfurane.
