= Bromobenzaldehyde =

Bromobenzaldehydes are any of three organic compounds with the formula BrC_{6}H_{4}COH, consisting of a formyl group and a bromine atom attached to a central benzene ring. They can be considered as brominated derivatives of benzaldehyde, or as formylated derivatives of bromobenzene.

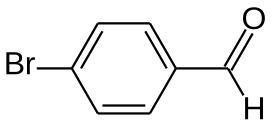
Bromobenzaldehyde isomers
Common name and systematic name	2-Bromobenzaldehyde	3-Bromobenzaldehyde	4-Bromobenzaldehyde
Structure
Molecular formula	C_{7}H_{5}BrO (BrC_{6}H_{4}COH)
Molar mass	185.020 g/mol
Appearance	colorless liquid	colorless liquid	white solid
CAS number	[6630-33-7]	[3132-99-8]	[1122-91-4]
Properties
Density and phase	1.585 g/ml, liquid	1.587 g/ml, liquid	solid
Solubility in water	practically insoluble
Melting point	16–19 °C	18–21 °C	57 °C
Boiling point	230 °C	233–236 °C	255–258 °C
