= List of reagents =

This is a list of inorganic and organic reagents commonly used in chemistry.

== Synopsis ==
Reagents are "substances or compounds that are added to a system in order to bring about a chemical reaction or are added to see if a reaction occurs." Some reagents are just a single element. However, most processes require reagents made of chemical compounds. Some of the most common ones used widely for specific reactive functions are listed below, but is by no means exhaustive.

== Reagent Compounds ==
Name	General Description
Acetic acid	an organic acid; is one of the simplest carboxylic acids
Acetone	an organic compound; simplest example of the ketones
Acetylene	a hydrocarbon and the simplest alkyne; widely used as a fuel and chemical building block
Ammonia	inorganic; the precursor to most nitrogen-containing compounds; used to make fertilizer
Ammonium hydroxide	aqueous ammonia; used in traditional qualitative inorganic analysis
Azobisisobutyronitrile	organic compound; often used as a foamer in plastics and rubber and as a radical initiator
Baeyer's reagent	is an alkaline solution of potassium permanganate; used in organic chemistry as a qualitative test for the presence of unsaturation, such as double bonds;
N-Bromosuccinimide	used in radical substitution and electrophilic addition reactions in organic chemistry. Also acts as a mild oxidizer to oxidize benzylic or allylic alcohols.
Butanone (methyl ethyl ketone)	organic compound; similar solvent properties to acetone but has a significantly slower evaporation rate
Butylated hydroxytoluene	a fat-soluble organic compound that is primarily used as an antioxidant food additive
n-Butyllithium	an organolithium reagent; used as a polymerization initiator in the production of elastomers such as polybutadiene or styrene-butadiene-styrene (SBS)
Carbon disulfide	a non-polar solvent; used frequently as a building block in organic chemistry
Carbon tetrachloride	toxic, and its dissolving power is low; consequently, it has been largely superseded by deuterated solvents
Carbonyldiimidazole	often used for the coupling of amino acids for peptide synthesis and as a reagent in organic synthesis
Ceric ammonium nitrate	an inorganic compound; used as an oxidising agent in organic synthesis and as a standard oxidant in quantitative analysis
Chloridotris(triphenylphosphine) rhodium (I)	Coordination complex; used in homogeneous catalysis of alkenes to alkanes
Chloroform	organic compound; often used as CDCl3 (deuterated chloroform) as a solvent for NMR spectroscopy and as a general solvent.
Chromic acid	a strong and corrosive oxidising agent; an intermediate in chromium plating
Chromium trioxide	the acidic anhydride of chromic acid; mainly used in chrome-plating
Collins reagent	used to selectively oxidize primary alcohols to an aldehyde
Copper(I) iodide	useful in a variety of applications ranging from organic synthesis to cloud seeding
Dess–Martin periodinane	chemical reagent used to oxidize primary alcohols to aldehydes and secondary alcohols to ketones
Diborane	the central organic synthesis reagent for hydroboration
Dicyclohexylcarbodiimide	an organic compound; primary use is to couple amino acids during artificial peptide synthesis
Diethyl azodicarboxylate	a valuable reagent but also quite dangerous and explodes upon heating
Diethyl ether	organic compound; a common laboratory solvent
Dihydropyran	a heterocyclic compound; used as a protecting group for alcohols in organic synthesis.
Diisobutylaluminium hydride	an organoaluminium compound; a reducing agent; converts esters and nitriles to aldehydes
Diisopropyl azodicarboxylate	the diisopropyl ester of azodicarboxylic acid; a reagent in the production of many organic compounds
Dimethyl ether	the simplest ether; a useful precursor to other organic compounds and an aerosol propellant
Dimethylformamide	organic compound; a common solvent for chemical reactions
Dimethylsulfide	organosulfur compound; used in petroleum refining and in petrochemical production processes; a reducing agent in ozonolysis reactions
Dimethyl sulfoxide	an organosulfur compound; an important polar aprotic solvent that dissolves both polar and nonpolar compounds
Dioxane	a heterocyclic organic compound; classified as an ether
Ethanol	a powerful psychoactive drug; used in alcoholic beverages, in thermometers, as a solvent, and as a fuel
Fehling's reagent	used to differentiate between water-soluble aldehyde and ketone functional groups
Fenton's reagent	a solution of hydrogen peroxide and an iron catalyst that is used to oxidize contaminants or waste waters
Formaldehyde	the simplest aldehyde; an important precursor to many other chemical compounds, such as polymers and polyfunctional alcohols
Formic acid	the simplest carboxylic acid; often used as a source of the hydride ion
Grignard reagents	the most common application is for alkylation of aldehydes and ketones:
Hexamethylphosphoramide	a phosphoramide; useful polar aprotic solvent and additive in organic synthesis
Hydrazine	It's a good reducing agent and is used in the Wolff-Kishner reaction for reducing carbonyls to its corresponding alkanes. used as a foaming agent in preparing polymer foams; also a precursor to polymerization catalysts and pharmaceuticals; also as an Oxygen scavenger in Power Plants
Hydrazoic acid	used primarily for preservation of stock solutions, and as a reagent
Hydrochloric acid	a highly corrosive, strong mineral acid with many industrial uses
Hydrofluoric acid	valued source of fluorine, precursor to numerous pharmaceuticals; highly corrosive
Hydrogen peroxide	an oxidizer commonly used as a bleach
Imidazole	an organic compound; this aromatic heterocyclic is a diazole and is classified as an alkaloid
Isopropyl alcohol	simplest example of a secondary alcohol; dissolves a wide range of non-polar compounds
Lime	used in Flue Gas Desulphurisation in Power Plants
Limestone	used in Flue Gas Desulphurisation in Power Plants
Lithium aluminium hydride	a reducing agent in organic synthesis; used to prepare main group and transition metal hydrides from the corresponding metal halides
Lithium diisopropylamide	strong base used in organic chemistry for the deprotonation of weakly acidic compounds
Manganese dioxide	used as a pigment and as a precursor to other manganese compounds; used as a reagent in organic synthesis for the oxidation of allylic alcohols
Meta-Chloroperoxybenzoic acid	used as an oxidant in organic synthesis
Methyl tert-butyl ether	a gasoline additive; also used in organic chemistry as a relatively inexpensive solvent
Millon's reagent	an analytical reagent used to detect the presence of soluble proteins
Nitric acid	highly corrosive and toxic strong acid; used for the production of fertilizers, production of explosives, and as a component of aqua regia, as well as mixed acid for nitration of aromatic compounds
Osmium tetroxide	in organic synthesis, is widely used to oxidise alkenes to the vicinal diols
Oxalyl chloride	used in organic synthesis for the preparation of acid chlorides from the corresponding carboxylic acids, and for Swern oxidation of alcohols to aldehydes or ketones
Palladium(II) acetate	a catalyst for many organic reactions by combining with many common classes of organic compounds to form reactive adduct
Perchloric acid	a powerful oxidizing agent; readily forms explosive mixtures; mainly used in the production of rocket fuel
Phosphoric acid	a mineral acid with many industrial uses; commonly used in the laboratory preparation of hydrogen halides
Phosphorus pentachloride	one of the most important phosphorus chlorides; a chlorinating reagent. Also used as a dehydrating agent for oximes which turn them into nitriles.
Phosphorus tribromide	used for the conversion of alcohols to alkyl bromides
Phosphorus trichloride	most important of the three phosphorus chlorides; used to manufacture organophosphorus compounds; used to convert primary and secondary alcohols into alkyl chlorides, or carboxylic acids into acyl chlorides
Phosphoryl chloride	used to make phosphate esters such as tricresyl phosphate
Potassium dichromate	a common inorganic chemical reagent, most commonly used as an oxidizing agent in various laboratory and industrial applications
Potassium hydroxide	a strong base; precursor to most soft and liquid soaps as well as numerous potassium-containing chemicals
Potassium permanganate	a strong oxidizing agent; can be used to quantitatively determine the total oxidisable organic material in an aqueous sample; a reagent for the synthesis of organic compounds
Pyridinium chlorochromate	used to oxidize primary alcohols to aldehydes and secondary alcohols to ketones
Pyridinium dichromate (Cornforth reagent)	converts primary and secondary alcohols to ketones
Raney nickel	an alternative catalyst for the hydrogenation of vegetable oils; in organic synthesis, used for desulfurization
Sakaguchi's Reagent	Detects the presence of arginine
Samarium(II) iodide (Kagan Reagent)	a powerful reducing agent
Silver oxide	used to prepare other silver compounds; in organic chemistry, used as a mild oxidizing agent
Silver nitrate	precursor to many other silver compounds; commonly used in inorganic chemistry to abstract halides
Sodium amide	used in the industrial production of indigo, hydrazine, and sodium cyanide; used for the drying of ammonia; used as a strong base in organic chemistry
Sodium azide	gas-forming component in airbag systems; used in organic synthesis to introduce the azide functional group by displacement of halides
Sodium bis(trimethylsilyl)amide	a strong base; deprotonates ketones and esters to generate enolate derivative
Sodium borohydride	a versatile reducing agent; converts ketones and aldehydes to alcohols
Sodium chlorite	in organic synthesis, used for the oxidation of aldehydes to carboxylic acids
Sodium hydride	a strong base used in organic synthesis
Sodium hydroxide	strong base with many industrial uses; in the laboratory, used with acids to produce the corresponding salt, also used as an electrolyte
Sodium hypochlorite	frequently used as a disinfectant or a bleaching agent
Sodium nitrite	used to convert amines into diazo compounds
Sulfuric acid	strong mineral acid; applications include its use as a dehydrating agent in many chemical reactions, sulfonation, the purification of hydrocarbons, and the production of phosphoric acid
tert-Butyl hydroperoxide	used in a variety of oxidation processes; industrially, is used as a starter of radical polymerization
Tetrahydrofuran	one of the most polar ethers; a useful solvent; its main use is as a precursor to polymers
Tetrakis(triphenylphosphine)palladium(0)	a catalyst for palladium-catalyzed coupling reactions
Tetramethylammonium hydroxide	a quaternary ammonium salt; used as an anisotropic etchant of silicon; used as a basic solvent in the development of acidic photoresist in the photolithography process
Tetramethylsilane	the simplest tetraorganosilane; a building block in organometallic chemistry
Thionyl chloride	an inorganic compound; used in chlorination reactions; converts carboxylic acids to acyl chlorides
Thiophenol	an organosulfur compound; the simplest aromatic thiol
Titanium tetrachloride	an intermediate in the production of titanium metal and titanium dioxide
Tollens' reagent	a chemical test most commonly used to determine whether a known carbonyl-containing compound is an aldehyde or a ketone
Triphenylphosphine	used in the synthesis of organic and organometallic compounds

== See also ==
- Reagent
- Limiting reagent
- Category: Reagents for organic chemistry
