= 1,N6-Ethanoadenine =

1,N^{6}-Ethanoadenine

Names
- Preferred IUPAC name 8,9-Dihydro-7H-imidazo[2,1-i]purine

Identifiers
CAS Number	91996-61-1
3D model (JSmol)	Interactive image
ChemSpider	61297663
MeSH	1,N(6)-ethanoadenine
PubChem CID	136138644
- InChI: InChI=1S/C7H7N5/c1-2-12-4-11-6-5(7(12)8-1)9-3-10-6/h3-4,8H,1-2H2 Key: NTUVVWKLOXHUNZ-UHFFFAOYSA-N
- SMILES: C1CN2C=NC3=NC=NC3=C2N1

Properties
Chemical formula	C_{7}H_{7}N_{5}
Molar mass	161.168 g·mol^{−1}

Related compounds
Related compounds	3,N^{4}-Ethenocytosine; 1,N^{6}-Ethenoadenine
- Except where otherwise noted, data are given for materials in their standard state (at 25 °C [77 °F], 100 kPa). Infobox references

1,N^{6}-Ethanoadenine or epsilonA is a tricyclic derivative of adenine, where an ethylene bridge connect the amine group to the adjacent carbon on the six member ring, to add another five membered ring. This kind of modification can take place as a mutation of DNA. As a DNA modification it is called an etheno (ε) DNA adduct. Chloroacetaldehyde and 1,3-bis(2-chloroethyl)-1-nitrosourea (BCNU) can react with adenine to form 1,N^{6}-ethanoadenine.

Escherichia coli can fix these modifications using AlkB protein.

Another way to produce it is via cyclisation of N^{6}-hydroxyethyladenine with DIAD and triphenylphosphine in the Mitsunobu reaction in a THF/MeCN solvent or by reacting with SOCl_{2}.
