= Millon =

Millon is a French-origin name. Notable persons with the name include:

- Adolpho Millon Júnior (1895–1929), Brazilian footballer
- Charles Millon (born 1945), French politician
- Eugène Millon (1812-1867), French chemist known for Millon's reagent
- Mark Millon (born 1971), American lacrosse player
- Theodore Millon (1928–2014), American psychologist
  - Millon Clinical Multiaxial Inventory psychological assessment tool
