= Myers deoxygenation =

In organic chemistry, the Myers deoxygenation reaction is an organic redox reaction that reduces an alcohol into an alkyl position by way of an arenesulfonylhydrazine as a key intermediate. This name reaction is one of four discovered by Andrew Myers that are named after him; this reaction and the Myers allene synthesis reaction involve the same type of intermediate. The other reactions are Myers' asymmetric alkylation and Myers-Saito Cycloaromatization.

R–CH_{2}OH + H_{2}NNHSO_{2}Ar → R–CH_{2}N(SO_{2}Ar)NH_{2} → R–CH_{2}N=NH → R–CH_{3} + N_{2}

The reaction is a three-step one-pot process in which the alcohol first undergoes a Mitsunobu reaction with ortho-nitrobenzenesulfonylhydrazine in the presence of triphenylphosphine and diethyl azodicarboxylate. Unlike hydrazone-synthesis reactions, this reaction occurs on the same nitrogen of the hydrazine that has the arenesulfonyl substituent. Upon warming, this product undergoes an elimination of arylsulfinic acid to give an unstable diazene as a reactive intermediate. A radical process then promptly occurs with loss of dinitrogen to give the final alkyl product.

The alkyl-radical intermediate can instead undergo an intramolecular reaction with various other suitably-positioned functional groups within the molecule, such as alkenes or cyclopropanes, leading to alternate products.

If the diazene intermediate is able to undergo a sigmatropic rearrangement, this process occurs in preference to the simple radical reduction to give a hydrocarbon with a transposed π bond. For example, in the Myers allene synthesis, one of the two π bonds of the alkyne of a propargyl alcohol shifts, forming an allene. Likewise, the benzylic alcohol 1-naphthylmethanol rearranges to give a methylene-cyclohexyl product with loss of aromaticity.
