= C8H14N2O4 =

The molecular formula C_{8}H_{14}N_{2}O_{4} (molar mass: 202.21 g/mol, exact mass: 202.0954 u) may refer to:

- Coprine
- Diisopropyl azodicarboxylate (DIAD)
