= Myers allene synthesis =

Organic chemical reaction

In organic chemistry, the Myers allene synthesis is a chemical reaction that converts a propargyl alcohol into an allene by way of an arenesulfonylhydrazine as a key intermediate. This name reaction is one of two discovered by Andrew Myers that are named after him; both this reaction and the Myers deoxygenation reaction involve the same type of intermediate.

The reaction is a three-step process in which the alcohol first undergoes a Mitsunobu reaction with an arenesulfonylhydrazine in the presence of triphenylphosphine and diethyl azodicarboxylate. Unlike hydrazone-synthesis reactions, this reaction occurs on the same nitrogen of the hydrazine that has the arenesulfonyl substituent. Upon warming, this product undergoes an elimination of arylsulfinic acid to give an unstable diazene as a reactive intermediate. The diazene extrudes N_{2} to give isolated allene product. The authors describe this last step as a [3,3]-sigmatropic reaction in the original report but call it a retro-ene reaction in another publication. (Note: The IUPAC defines a sigmatropic rearrangement as a pericyclic reaction involving both breaking and formation of a new σ bond in which the total number of π and σ bonds do not change, whereas a retro-ene reaction involves the fragmentation of a molecule to a fragment with a double bond with allylic hydrogen (the 'ene') and a multiple-bonded species (the 'enophile') via a cyclic transition state. In this case, the reaction occurs with the net gain of a π bond and loss of a σ bond, so strictly speaking, only the description of the reaction as a retro-ene reaction is apt.)

Both the first step (Mitsunobu reaction) and third step (sigmatropic reaction) are stereospecific, so the chirality of the propargyl alcohol controls the chirality of the resulting allene.

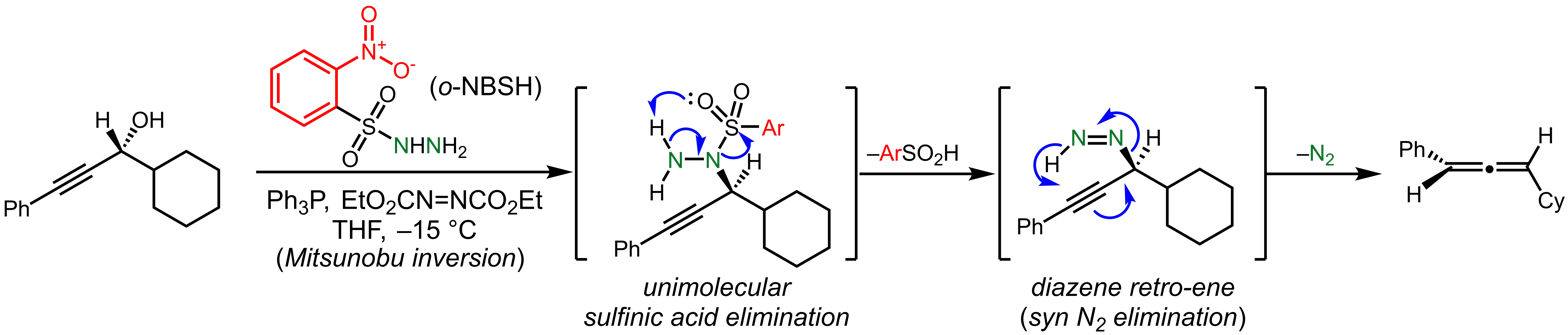

The use of ortho-nitrobenzenesulfonylhydrazine gives reactants and intermediates with appropriate relative stability to enable the whole process to be performed as a one-pot reaction, though the order in which the reagents are mixed is important. Mechanistic studies suggest that the diazene is formed as mixture of cis and trans isomers that easily interconvert, and that the cis is what reacts most readily to form the allene.
