= Tōyō Mitsunobu =

Imperial Japanese Navy rear admiral (1897–1944)

- 光延 東洋
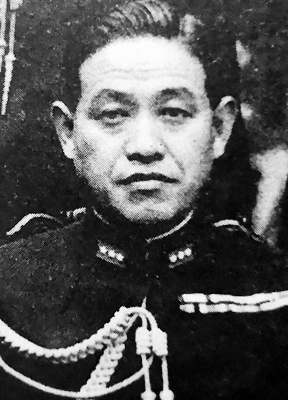
- Born: 9 October 1897; Takahashi, Okayama, Japan
- Died: 8 June 1944 (aged 46); Florencia, Italy
- Education: Imperial Japanese Navy Academy
- Children: Oyo Mitsunobu
- Military career
- Allegiance: Empire of Japan
- Branch: Imperial Japanese Navy
- Service years: 1919–1944
- Rank: Rear admiral (posthumous)
- Unit: Imperial Fleet
- Conflicts: Second Sino-Japanese War; World War II
- Other work: Naval attaché

Tōyō Mitsunobu (光延 東洋, Mitsunobu Tōyō; 9 October 1897 – 8 June 1944) was a captain in the Imperial Japanese Navy. Mitsunobu worked in the Japanese naval command in China.

== Biography ==
Mitsunobu attended secondary school in Osaka and then the Imperial Japanese Navy Academy, graduating in 1919. He later entered active service in the Imperial Japanese Navy. In 1929, he was transferred to the command of the Imperial Fleet.

In 1934, he was part of the staff of Isoroku Yamamoto during the preparation of the Japanese delegation for the London naval conference in which he participated as an attendant. He was probably chosen as a participant because he was aware of the European mentality with which he had become familiar as early as the 1930s when he was a naval attaché at the Japanese embassy in Paris. Following this, he participated as a ship's officer in the Second Sino-Japanese War.

Toyo Mitsunobu and his family on the balcony of the Rome military attaché's residence

During the later stages of World War II, Mitsunobu was posted to Italy as a naval attaché to the Japanese embassy. There, he contributed to an Italian propaganda magazine, Yamato, founded in 1941 to improve the political alliance of Italy and Japan. According to some sources, he also pursued secret service duties and held the role of deputy secret service chief for the Mediterranean of the Japanese Foreign Ministry.

On 8 June 1944, Mitsunobu was travelling to Merano for a naval conference of the Axis governments, together with his assistant head Yamanaka. In Pianosinatico (close to Abetone pass) along the Gothic Line, his car was stopped by Italian partisans, commanded by Manrico "Pippo" Ducceschi, and was killed as he tried to escape. Important documents concerning the Pacific War were found, which helped enable the United States and the Allies in their later manoeuvers. He was buried in Königstein, but his remains were brought back to Japan in 1994.

His son, Oyo Mitsunobu, was a chemist and discovered the Mitsunobu reaction.
