= Transition metal nitroso complexes =

Structure of the dye Naphthol Green B, which features of nitroso ligand bound to Fe(III).

Transition metal nitroso complexes are coordination complexes containing one or more organonitroso ligands (RNO).

== Structure and bonding ==
Organic nitroso compounds bind to metals in several ways, but most commonly as monodentate N-bonded ligands. Also known are O-bonded, η^{2}-N,O-bonded. Dimers of organic nitroso compounds also bind in a κ^{2}--O,O bidentate manner. Illustrative are Ru(acac)_{2}(C_{6}H_{5}NO)_{2}, where a pair nitrosobenzenes are monodentate, and [Ru(acac)_{2}(μ−C_{6}H_{5}NO)]_{2} where two nitrosobenzenes bridge.

=== Chelating nitroso ligands ===
Trapping of 1,2-dinitrosobenzene by Ru(II)

Arylnitroso compounds with a flanking hydroxy group are a well-developed, e.g. 1-nitroso-2-naphthol. They are precursors to anionic N,O chelating ligands. Chelating dinitrosoarenes are uncommon but have been investigated.

== Synthesis ==
Organic nitroso complexes can be prepared from preformed organic nitroso precursors. These precursors usually exist as N-N bonded dimers, but the dimer dissociates readily. This direct method is used to give W(CO)_{5}(tert-BuNO) (where tert-Bu is (CH_{3})_{3}C). The Fe-porphyrin complex depicted below is prepared by this route. More complicated but more biorelevant routes involve degradation of precursors such as nitrobenzene and phenylhydroxylamine.

Ni(PEt_{3})_{4} + i−PrNO_{2} → Ni(PEt_{3})_{2}(η^{2}-i−PrNO) + PEt_{3} + OPEt_{3} (Et = C_{2}H_{5}, i-Pr = (CH_{3})_{2}CH)

The coupling of organic ligands and nitric oxide is yet another route.

== Connection to methemoglobinemia ==
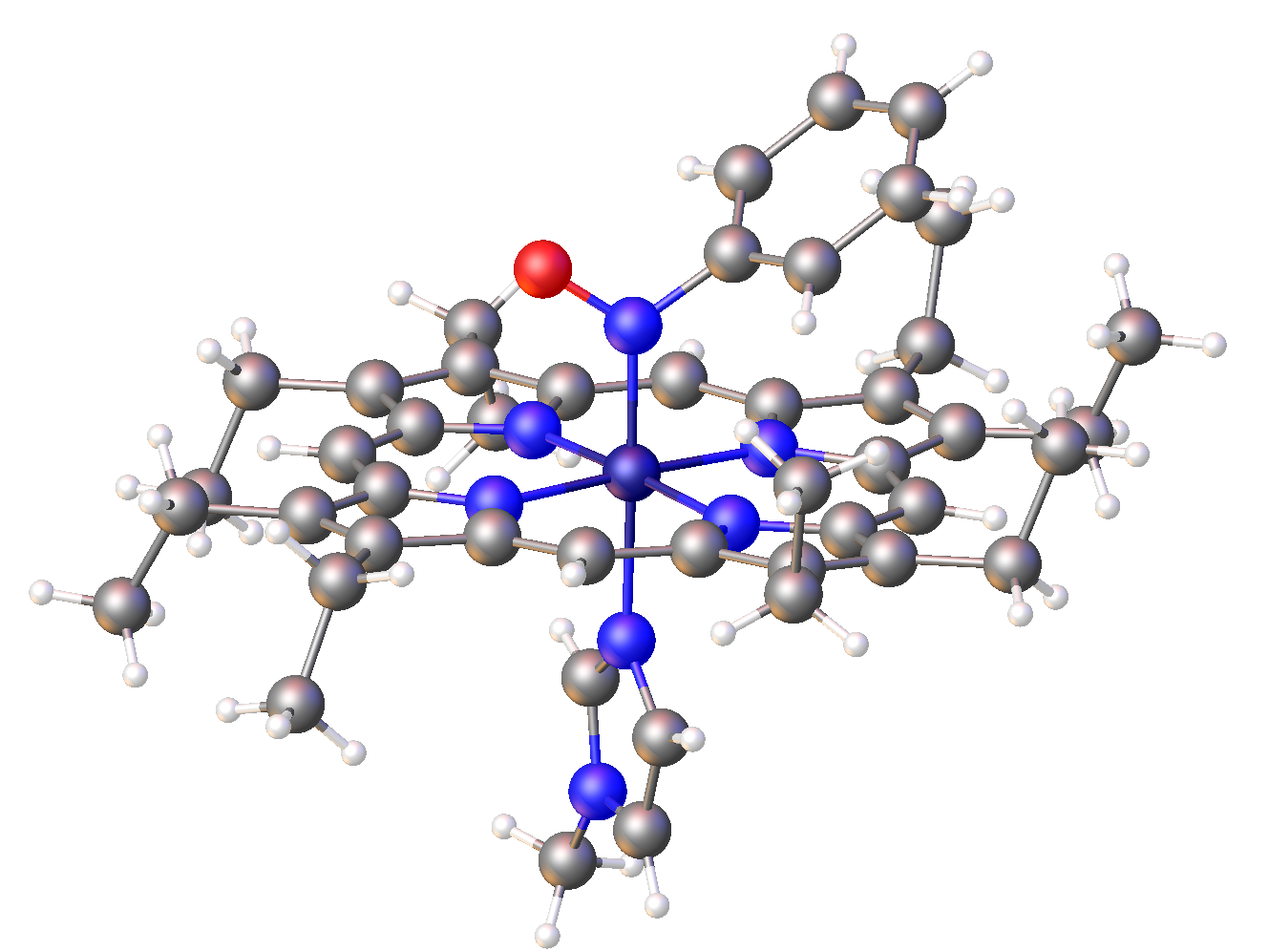
Structure of Fe(octaethylporphyrin)(C_{6}H_{5}NO)(imidazole). This synthetic complex is thought to resemble heme inhibited by nitroso benzene. Color code: red = O, blue = N, Fe, gray = C, white = H.

Methemoglobinemia is a disorder where a large fraction of hemoglobin in one's blood has converted to inactive forms, generically called methemoglobin. Since methemoglobin is not an oxygen-carrier, methemoglobinemia is a serious disorder, sometimes fatal. Exposure to nitrobenzene, aniline, and their derivatives cause this disorder, which is attributed to their conversion to nitrosobenzene (and derivatives), which inactivate hemoglobin by forming a complex with the Fe center, precluding binding of O_{2}.

== Related compounds ==
As indicated by the applications in dyeing, chelating aryl nitroso compounds often form deeply colored complexes

- Cupferron, C6H5N(O-)NO, an anionic O-O chelating proligand was once a popular reagent for the analysis of metal ions.
- Millon's reagent, which involves nitroso-based ligands, was once a test for proteins
