= Giuseppe Tucci =

Italian orientalist, Indologist and scholar

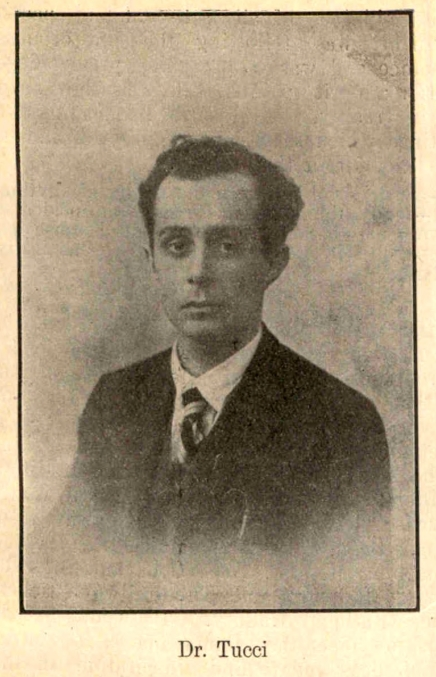
- Born: 5 June 1894; Macerata, Kingdom of Italy
- Died: 5 April 1984 (aged 89); San Polo dei Cavalieri, Italy
- Occupations: Orientalist, Indologist, scholar

Giuseppe Tucci (Italian pronunciation: [dʒuˈzɛppe ˈtuttʃi]; 5 June 1894 – 5 April 1984) was an Italian orientalist, Indologist and scholar of East Asian studies, specializing in Tibetan culture and the history of Buddhism. During its zenith, Tucci was a supporter of Italian fascism, and he used idealized portrayals of Asian traditions to support Italian ideological campaigns. Tucci was fluent in several European languages, Sanskrit, Bengali, Pali, Prakrit, Chinese and Tibetan and he taught at the University of Rome La Sapienza until his death. He is considered one of the founders of the field of Buddhist studies.

== Life and work ==
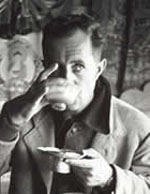
Tucci drinking butter tea in Tibet in 1937 (photo by Fosco Maraini)

=== Education and background ===
He was born to a middle-class Italian family (from Apulia) in Macerata, Marche, and thrived academically. He taught himself Hebrew, Chinese and Sanskrit before even going to university and in 1911, aged only 18, he published a collection of Latin inscriptions in the prestigious Zeitschrift des Deutschen Archäologischen Instituts. He completed his studies at the University of Rome in 1919, where his studies were repeatedly interrupted as a result of World War I.

After graduating, he traveled to India and settled down at the Visva-Bharati University, founded by the Bengali poet and Nobel Laureate, Rabindranath Tagore. There he studied Buddhism, Tibetan and Bengali, and also taught Italian and Chinese. He also studied and taught at Dhaka University, the University of Benares and Calcutta University. He remained in India until 1931, when he returned to Italy.

=== Scholarship and reputation ===
He was Italy's foremost scholar of the East, with such diverse research interests ranging from ancient Iranian religion to Indian and Chinese philosophy. He taught primarily at the University of Rome but was a visiting scholar at institutions throughout Europe and Asia. In 1931, the University of Naples "L'Orientale" made him its first Chair of Chinese Language and Literature. In 1933 he promoted the foundation the Italian Institute for the Middle and Far East - IsMEO (Istituto italiano per il Medio ed Estremo Oriente), based in Rome. The IsMEO was established as a "Moral body directly depending on Mussolini". Until 1945, when the IsMEO was closed, Gentile was its president and Tucci was its managing vice-president and, later, director of the courses of languages.

Tucci officially visited Japan for the first time in November 1936, and remained there for over two months until January 1937, when he attended at the opening of the Italian-Japanese Institute (Istituto Italo-nipponico) in Tokyo. Tucci traveled all over Japan giving lectures on Tibet and "racial purity".

He organised several pioneering archaeological digs throughout Asia, such as in Swat in Pakistan, Ghazni in Afghanistan, Persepolis in Iran and in the Himalayas. In 1948 he led an expedition into Tibet accompanied by Tenzing Norgay who was to summit Everest 5 years later. According to Norgay's account in "Man of Everest" Tucci was an excitable and energetic man on his eighth visit to the country. The trip included an audience with the Dalai Lama in the Potala Palace and bumping into Heinrich Harrer author of "Seven Years in Tibet". He was also the promoter of the National Museum of Oriental Art. In 1978 he received the Jawaharlal Nehru Award for International Understanding, in 1979 the Balzan Prize for History (ex aequo with Ernest Labrousse). During the course of his life, he wrote over 360 books and articles.

=== Politics ===
Tucci was a supporter of Italian Fascism and Benito Mussolini. His collaboration began in his student days at the University of Rome, where he first met Giovanni Gentile (at the time, Professor of the History of Philosophy and already a close friend and collaborator of Mussolini), and continued right up to Gentile's assassination in 1944, which led to the forced closure of IsMEO for over two years until 1947. In November 1936 - January 1937 he was the representative of Mussolini in Japan, where he was sent to improve the diplomatic relations between Italy and Japan and to make Fascist propaganda. On 27 April 1937 he gave a speech on the radio in Japanese on Mussolini's behalf. In this country his action paved the way to the inclusion of Italy to the Anti-Comintern Pact (6 November 1937). Tucci was a member of the editorial board of an Italian propaganda magazine, Yamato, which was started in 1941 to improve the political alliance of Italy and Japan.

He wrote popular articles for the Italian state that decried the rationalism of industrialized 1930s–1940s Europe and expressed a yearning for a more authentic existence in touch with nature, which he claimed could be found in Asia. According to the Tibetologist Donald S. Lopez, "For Tucci, Tibet was an ecological paradise and timeless utopia into which industrialized Europe figuratively could escape and find peace, a cure for western ills, and from which Europe could find its own pristine past to which to return." Hugh Richardson and David Snellgrove in the dedication of their 1968 book of A Cultural History of Tibet wrote, "To Giuseppe Tucci who has revealed so many hidden treasures of Tibet life, art and learning." A fictional Tucci, played by Marcel Iureș, appears as a character in Francis Ford Coppola's 2007 film Youth Without Youth.

=== Death ===
Tucci died in San Polo dei Cavalieri, near Rome, in 1984.

==== Biography ====
The only biography on Tucci is by Enrica Garzilli, L'esploratore del Duce. Le avventure di Giuseppe Tucci e la politica italiana in Oriente da Mussolini a Andreotti. Con il carteggio di Giulio Andreotti, Roma/Milano: Memori, Asiatica, 2012 (3rd ed. 2014), 2 vols.; vol. 1, pp. lii+685, ISBN 978-8890022654; vol. 2, pp. xiv + 724 ISBN 978-8890022661.

== Selected bibliography ==
- Indo-tibetica 1: Mc'od rten e ts'a ts'a nel Tibet indiano ed occidentale: contributo allo studio dell'arte religiosa tibetana e del suo significato, Roma, Reale Accademia d'Italia, 1932 (Chinese transl.:《梵天佛地 1: 西北印度和西藏西部的塔和擦擦——试论藏族宗教艺术及其意义》, 魏正中 萨尔吉 主编. 上海, 上海古籍出版社, 2009);
- Indo-tibetica 2: Rin c'en bzan po e la rinascita del buddhismo nel Tibet intorno al Mille, Roma, Reale Accademia d'Italia, 1933 (English transl.: Rin-chen-bzan-po and the renaissance of Buddhism in Tibet around the millennium, New Delhi, Aditya Prakashan, [1988]; Chinese transl.:《梵天佛地 2: 仁钦桑波及公元1000年左右藏传佛教的复兴》, 魏正中 萨尔吉 主编. 上海, 上海古籍出版社, 2009);
- (with E. Ghersi) Cronaca della missione scientifica Tucci nel Tibet occidentale (1933), Roma, Reale Accademia d'Italia, 1934 (English transl.: Secrets of Tibet. Being the chronicle of the Tucci Scientific Expedition to Western Tibet, 1933, London & Glasgow, Blackie & Son, 1935);
- Indo-tibetica 3 : I templi del Tibet occidentale e il loro simbolismo artistico, 2 vols, Roma, Reale Accademia d'Italia, 1935-1936 (Chinese transl.:《梵天佛地 3: 西藏西部的寺院及其艺术象征》, 魏正中 萨尔吉 主编. 上海, 上海古籍出版社, 2009);
- Santi e briganti nel Tibet ignoto: diario della spedizione nel Tibet occidentale 1935, Milano, U. Hoepli, 1937;
- Indo-tibetica 4: Gyantse ed i suoi monasteri, 3 vols, Roma, Reale Accademia d'Italia, 1941 (English transl.: Gyantse and its monasteries, New Delhi, Aditya Prakashan, 1989; Chinese transl.:《梵天佛地 4: 江孜及其寺院》, 魏正中 萨尔吉 主编. 上海, 上海古籍出版社, 2009);
- Asia religiosa, Roma, Partenia, 1946;
- Tibetan Painted Scrolls, 3 vols, Roma, Istituto Poligrafico e Zecca dello Stato, 1949;
- Teoria e pratica del Mandala, Roma, Astrolabio, 1949 (English transl.: The theory and practice of the Mandala, London, Rider and Co., 1961);
- Italia e Oriente, Milano, Garzanti, 1949;
- Tibetan folksongs from the district of Gyantse, Ascona, Artibus Asiae, 1949; 2nd rev. ed. 1966;
- The Tombs of the Tibetan Kings, Roma, IsMEO, 1950;
- A Lhasa e oltre, Roma, La Libreria dello Stato, 1950 (English transl.: To Lhasa and beyond, Roma, La Libreria dello Stato, 1956);
- Tra giungle e pagode, Roma, La Libreria dello Stato, 1953;
- Preliminary report on two scientific expeditions in Nepal, Roma, IsMEO, 1956;
- Storia della filosofia indiana, Bari, Laterza, 1957;
- Nepal: alla scoperta dei Malla, Bari, Leonardo da Vinci, 1960 (English transl.: Nepal. The discovery of the Malla, London, George Allen & Unwin, 1962);
- Die Religionen Tibets in G. Tucci and W. Heissig, Die Religionen Tibets und der Mongolei, Stuttgart, Kohlhammer Verlag, 1970 (English transl.: The religions of Tibet, London, Routledge & Kegan Paul, 1980).
- " Tibet. Land of Snows" Translated by J. E. Stapleton Driver. Oxford & IBH PublishingCo., Calcutta. Bombay. New Delhi.
