= 1-Nitroso-2-naphthol =

Names
- Preferred IUPAC name 1-Nitrosonaphthalen-2-ol

Identifiers
CAS Number	131-91-9
3D model (JSmol)	Interactive image
ChemSpider	8262
ECHA InfoCard	100.004.586
EC Number	205-043-0
PubChem CID	8580
UNII	757I55U2QX
CompTox Dashboard (EPA)	DTXSID9059622
- InChI: InChI=1S/C10H7NO2/c12-9-6-5-7-3-1-2-4-8(7)10(9)11-13/h1-6,12H Key: YXAOOTNFFAQIPZ-UHFFFAOYSA-N
- SMILES: C1=CC=C2C(=C1)C=CC(=C2N=O)O

Properties
Chemical formula	C_{10}H_{7}NO_{2}
Molar mass	173.171 g·mol^{−1}
Appearance	Yellowish-brown
Melting point	109.5 °C (229.1 °F; 382.6 K)

Hazards
- GHS labelling
Pictograms	(GHS07: Exclamation mark) (GHS09: Environmental hazard)
Signal word	Warning
Hazard statements	H302, H315, H319, H335, H400
Precautionary statements	P261, P264, P264+P265, P270, P271, P273, P280, P301+P317, P302+P352, P304+P340, P305+P351+P338, P319, P321, P330, P332+P317, P337+P317, P362+P364, P391, P403+P233, P405, P501
- Except where otherwise noted, data are given for materials in their standard state (at 25 °C [77 °F], 100 kPa). Infobox references

1-Nitroso-2-naphthol is an organic compound with the formula C_{10}H_{6}(NO)OH. It is one of several possible nitrosonaphthols, and the most studied for applications as an indicator and a dye.

== Synthesis and reactions ==
1-Nitroso-2-naphthol can be prepared by treatment of 2-naphthol with nitrous acid:

C_{10}H_{7}OH + HNO_{2} → C_{10}H_{6}(NO)OH + H_{2}O

Its conjugate base forms deeply colored complexes with iron(II) and cobalt(II), complexes [M(C_{10}H_{6}(NO)O)_{3}]^{2-}. The deep colors of these complexes results from the delocalized bonding within each five-membered chelate ring. These species can be classified as nitroso complexes.

== See also ==
- Naphthol Green B, the iron complex of a sulfonated derivative of 1-nitroso-2-naphthol
