= Yamato (magazine) =

Bilingual propaganda magazine in Italy (1941–1943)

- Categories: Propaganda magazine; Political magazine
- Frequency: Monthly
- Publisher: Istituto Geografico De Agostini
- Founded: 1941
- Final issue: August 1943
- Country: Italy
- Based in: Rome
- Language: Italian; Japanese

Yamato was an Italian monthly propaganda magazine which existed between early 1941 and August 1943. The magazine aimed at making the Japanese culture much more familiar in Italy and featured articles written in Italian and Japanese. Its subtitle was Mensile Italo-Giapponese.

== History and profile ==
Yamato was launched in early 1941 following the establishment of the Tripartite Pact in January 1941. It was started under the patronage of Pompeo Aloisi. The magazine was closely connected with an association called Friends of Japan of which the first head was Paulucci di Calboli. Pompeo Aloisi also headed the Friends of Japan Association. The publisher was Istituto Geografico De Agostini (Italian: Geographic Institute De Agostini). The following figures were the members of Yamato's editorial board: Pietro Silvio Rivetta di Solonghello who was also the editorial director, Giuseppe Tucci and Giacinto Auriti. In addition to Italian contributors the magazine had Japanese contributors, including Navy Admiral Tōyō Mitsunobu and Colonel Moriakira Shimizu who were working as military attachés at the Japanese embassy in Rome.

The last issue of Yamato appeared in August 1943 immediately after the end of the Fascist rule in Italy.
