= Oyo Mitsunobu =

Family photograph, c. 1940–1944

Ōyō Mitsunobu (光延 旺洋, Mitsunobu Ōyō; 1934–2003) was a Japanese chemist specializing in organic synthesis. In 1967, he introduced the Mitsunobu reaction, which is named after him.

His father was Tōyō Mitsunobu, an admiral (posthumously) of the Japanese navy. Mitsunobu earned his bachelor's degree at Gakushuin University in Tokyo and subsequently studied at the Tokyo Institute of Technology starting in 1959, where he obtained his doctorate in 1966 under the supervision of Teruaki Mukaiyama. From 1986-2002 he was a Professor in the Faculty of Science and Engineering, Aoyama Gakuin University.

His work focused on the chemistry of nucleosides and nucleotides, as well as stereoselective reactions. He is best known for the Mitsunobu reaction which involves the substitution of (primary or secondary) alcohols with nucleophiles (the original reaction was an esterification) and has found widespread application, particularly in the synthesis of natural products and in biochemistry. It proceeds under relatively mild conditions and is stereospecific. It is an oxidation-reduction condensation reaction in which triphenylphosphine is oxidized and diethyl azodicarboxylate (DEAD) is reduced to its corresponding hydrazine derivative (reagents serving a similar function to triphenylphosphine and DEAD in the original version of the reaction are known as Mitsunobu reagents). Mitsunobu introduced the reaction in 1967 and developed several variants shortly thereafter. Between 1996 and 2008, 1,615 papers with "Mitsunobu reaction" in the title were published according to SciFinder, including 186 patents.

In 1984 he received the Synthetic Organic Chemistry Award, Japan. The text of the award states that it is for the "Discovery and development of stereospecific reactions through activation of alcoholic hydroxyl groups".
