= Naphthol Green B =

Names
- IUPAC name trisodium; iron(3+); 5-nitroso-6-oxidonaphthalene-2-sulfonate
- Other names Acid Green 1; C.I. 10020

Identifiers
CAS Number	19381-50-1
3D model (JSmol)	Interactive image
ChEBI	CHEBI:87073
ChemSpider	5291687
ECHA InfoCard	100.039.085
EC Number	243-010-2
PubChem CID	6915910
UNII	W60I5H3VMQ
CompTox Dashboard (EPA)	DTXSID4044406
- InChI: InChI=1S/3C10H7NO5S.Fe.3Na/c3*12-9-4-1-6-5-7(17(14,15)16)2-3-8(6)10(9)11-13;;;;/h3*1-5,12H,(H,14,15,16);;;;/q;;;+3;3*+1/p-6 Key: JMXROTHPANUTOJ-UHFFFAOYSA-H
- SMILES: C1=CC2=C(C=CC(=C2N=O)[O-])C=C1S(=O)(=O)[O-].C1=CC2=C(C=CC(=C2N=O)[O-])C=C1S(=O)(=O)[O-].C1=CC2=C(C=CC(=C2N=O)[O-])C=C1S(=O)(=O)[O-].[Na+].[Na+].[Na+].[Fe+3]

Properties
Chemical formula	C_{30}H_{15}FeN_{3}Na_{3}O_{15}S_{3}
Molar mass	878.45 g·mol^{−1}
Density	1.423 g/cm^{3}
Melting point	349.84 °C
- Except where otherwise noted, data are given for materials in their standard state (at 25 °C [77 °F], 100 kPa). verify (what is ?) Infobox references

Naphthol Green B is a coordination complex of iron that is used as a dye. The ligand is a sulfonated derivative of 1-nitroso-2-naphthol.

== Structure ==
Naphthol Green B is the sodium salt of Naphthol Green Y (C.I. 10005). The organic ligands each bind to iron as bidentate ligands through the nitrogen and the anionic phenoxide groups. Three ligands are bound to the iron.

== Applications ==
Its absorption maximum is 714 nm in water. It is water-soluble.

Naphthol Green B is used in histology to stain collagen. Moreover, it is used for polychrome stains with animal tissue. For industry purposes Naphthol Green B is used for staining wool, nylon, paper, anoxidized aluminium and soap.
