= Eugène Millon =

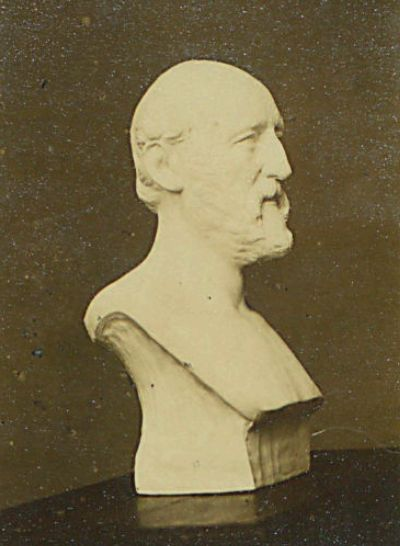
- Born: 24 April 1812; Saint-Seine-l'Abbaye
- Died: 22 October 1867 (aged 55)
- Known for: Millon's reagent

Eugène Auguste Nicolas Millon (24 April 1812 – 22 October 1867) was a French chemist and medical doctor. He is remembered in the name of Millon's reagent which reacts with tyrosine in proteins to form a brown precipitate. The reagent is used for determination of the presence of soluble proteins.

Millon was born in Saint-Seine-l'Abbaye and after his education, he taught briefly at the Collège Rollin after before training in medicine at the military hospital at Val-de-Grâce from 1832 to 1835. After serving for a while in the army he left surgery to study pharmacy and chemistry and became a pharmacist in 1838, serving from 1850 to 1865 in Algeria. His most well-known contribution was the reaction of mercury and nitric acid with egg albumen which produces a white precipitate that turns red on heating. His other contributions were on compounds of chlorine and iodine including the acids. He examined salts in blood.

An Algerian stamp commemorating him was released in 1954, while Algeria was still a French Département.

== See also ==
1. Millon's Base

2. Millon's reagent
