= Reagent =

Substance added to a system to cause a chemical reaction

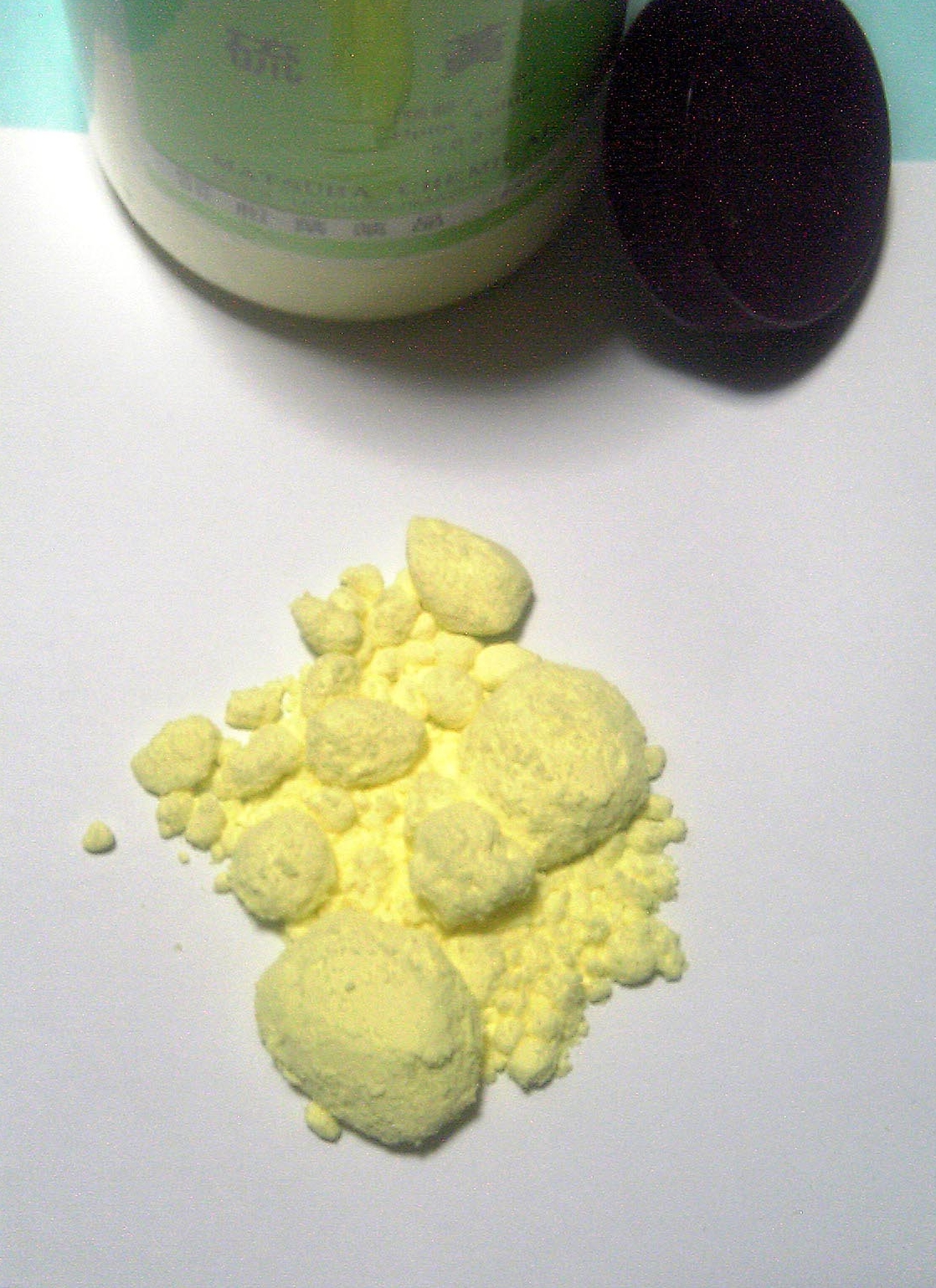
Reagents, such as sulfur (pictured), are the starting materials used in chemical reactions.

In chemistry, a reagent (/riˈeɪdʒənt/ ree-AY-jənt) or analytical reagent is a substance or compound added to a system to cause a chemical reaction, or test if one occurs. A reactant is a substance or compound that is consumed in a chemical reaction. The terms reactant and reagent are often used interchangeably, but reactant specifies a substance consumed in the course of a chemical reaction; reagent is used in the context of chemical analysis, while reactant is used in the context of reaction itself. Solvents, though involved in the reaction mechanism, are usually not called reactants. Similarly, catalysts are not consumed by the reaction, so they are not reactants. In biochemistry, especially in connection with enzyme-catalyzed reactions, the reactants are commonly called substrates.

== Definitions ==
=== Organic chemistry ===
In organic chemistry, the term "reagent" denotes a chemical ingredient (a compound or mixture, typically of inorganic or small organic molecules) introduced to cause the desired transformation of an organic substance. Examples include the Collins reagent, Fenton's reagent, and Grignard reagents.

=== Analytical chemistry ===
In analytical chemistry, a reagent is a compound or mixture used to detect the presence or absence of another substance, e.g. by a color change, or to measure the concentration of a substance, e.g. by colorimetry. Examples include Fehling's reagent, Millon's reagent, and Tollens' reagent.

== Commercial or laboratory preparations ==
In commercial or laboratory preparations, reagent-grade designates chemical substances meeting standards of purity that ensure the scientific precision and reliability of chemical analysis, chemical reactions or physical testing. Purity standards for reagents are set by organizations such as ASTM International or the American Chemical Society. For instance, reagent-quality water must have very low levels of impurities such as sodium and chloride ions, silica, and bacteria, as well as a very high electrical resistivity. Laboratory products which are less pure, but still useful and economical for undemanding work, may be designated as technical, practical, or crude grade to distinguish them from reagent versions.

== Biology ==
In the field of biology, the biotechnology revolution in the 1980s grew from the development of reagents that could be used to identify and manipulate the chemical matter in and on cells. These reagents included antibodies (polyclonal and monoclonal), oligomers, all sorts of model organisms and immortalised cell lines, reagents and methods for molecular cloning and DNA replication, and many others.

=== Tool compounds ===
Tool compounds are an important class of reagent in biology. They are small molecules or biochemicals like siRNA or antibodies that are known to directly interact with or modulate a specific biomolecule—for example a drug target—but are unlikely to be useful as drugs themselves, and are often starting points in the drug discovery process.

However, many natural substances are hits in almost any assay in which they are tested, and therefore not useful as tool compounds. Medicinal chemists class them instead as pan-assay interference compounds. One example is curcumin.

== See also ==
- Limiting reagent
- Common reagents
- Product
- Reagent bottle
- Substrate
