= Diisopropyl azodicarboxylate =

- Diisopropyl azodicarboxylate

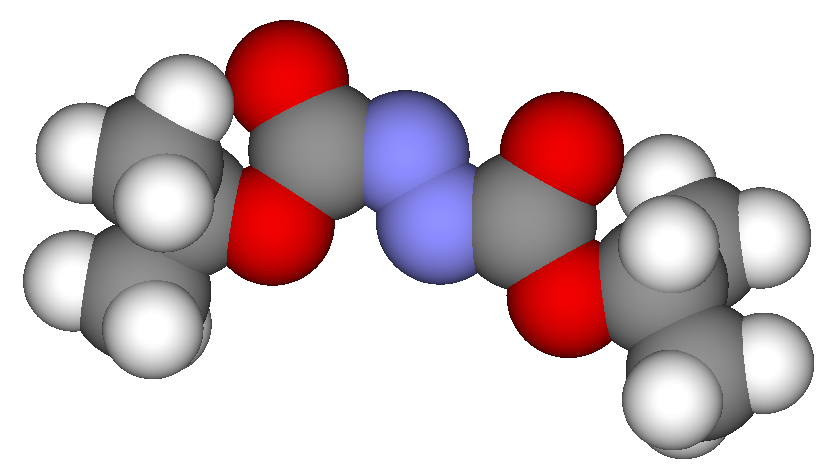

Names
- IUPAC name Diisopropyl azodicarboxylate
- Systematic IUPAC name Propan-2-yl (NE)-N-propan-2-yloxycarbonyliminocarbamate
- Other names DIAD

Identifiers
| CAS Number | 2446-83-5 |
| 3D model (JSmol) | Interactive image; Interactive image |
| ChemSpider | 4515532 |
| ECHA InfoCard | 100.017.730 |
| EC Number | 219-502-8 |
| PubChem CID | 5363146 |
| UNII | 7W701BXX4K |
| CompTox Dashboard (EPA) | DTXSID50894754 |
- InChI: InChI=1S/C8H14N2O4/c1-5(2)13-7(11)9-10-8(12)14-6(3)4/h5-6H,1-4H3/b10-9+ Key: VVWRJUBEIPHGQF-MDZDMXLPSA-N; InChI=1/C8H14N2O4/c1-5(2)13-7(11)9-10-8(12)14-6(3)4/h5-6H,1-4H3/b10-9+ Key: VVWRJUBEIPHGQF-MDZDMXLPBM
- SMILES: O=C(OC(C)C)\N=N/C(OC(C)C)=O; O=C(/N=N/C(=O)OC(C)C)OC(C)C

Properties
| Chemical formula | C_{8}H_{14}N_{2}O_{4} |
| Molar mass | 202.210 g·mol^{−1} |
| Appearance | Orange liquid |
| Density | 1.027 g/cm^{3} |
| Melting point | 3 to 5 °C (37 to 41 °F; 276 to 278 K) |
| Boiling point | 75 °C (167 °F; 348 K) at 0.25 mmHg |
| Solubility in water | insoluble |
| Refractive index (n_{D}) | 1.418-1.422 |

Hazards
- GHS labelling
| Pictograms | (GHS07: Exclamation mark) (GHS08: Health hazard) (GHS09: Environmental hazard) |
| Signal word | Warning |
| Hazard statements | H315, H319, H335, H373, H411 |
| Precautionary statements | P260, P264, P271, P273, P280, P302+P352, P304+P340, P305+P351+P338, P312, P314, P321, P332+P313, P337+P313, P362, P391, P403+P233, P405, P501 |
| Flash point | 106 °C (223 °F; 379 K) |
| Safety data sheet (SDS) | Sigma-Aldrich |
- Except where otherwise noted, data are given for materials in their standard state (at 25 °C [77 °F], 100 kPa). verify (what is ?) Infobox references

Diisopropyl azodicarboxylate (DIAD) is the diisopropyl ester of azodicarboxylic acid. It is used as a reagent in the production of many organic compounds. It is often used with triphenylphosphine in the Mitsunobu reaction, wherein it serves as a hydride acceptor. It has also been used to generate aza-Baylis-Hillman adducts with acrylates. It can also serve as a selective deprotectant of N-benzyl groups in the presence of other protecting groups.

It is sometimes preferred to diethyl azodicarboxylate (DEAD) because it is more hindered, and thus less likely to form hydrazide byproducts.

Under conditions relevant to the Mitsunobu reaction (in the presence of triphenylphosphine at high concentrations), DIAD has been shown by EPR spectroscopy to form a highly unusual tetrazetidine radical cation (a square of nitrogen atoms), corresponding to formal [2+2]-cycloaddition of the N=N bonds of two molecules of DIAD along with loss of a single electron.

One notable use of this compound is in the synthesis of bifenazate.
