= Diethyl azodicarboxylate =

Chemical compound

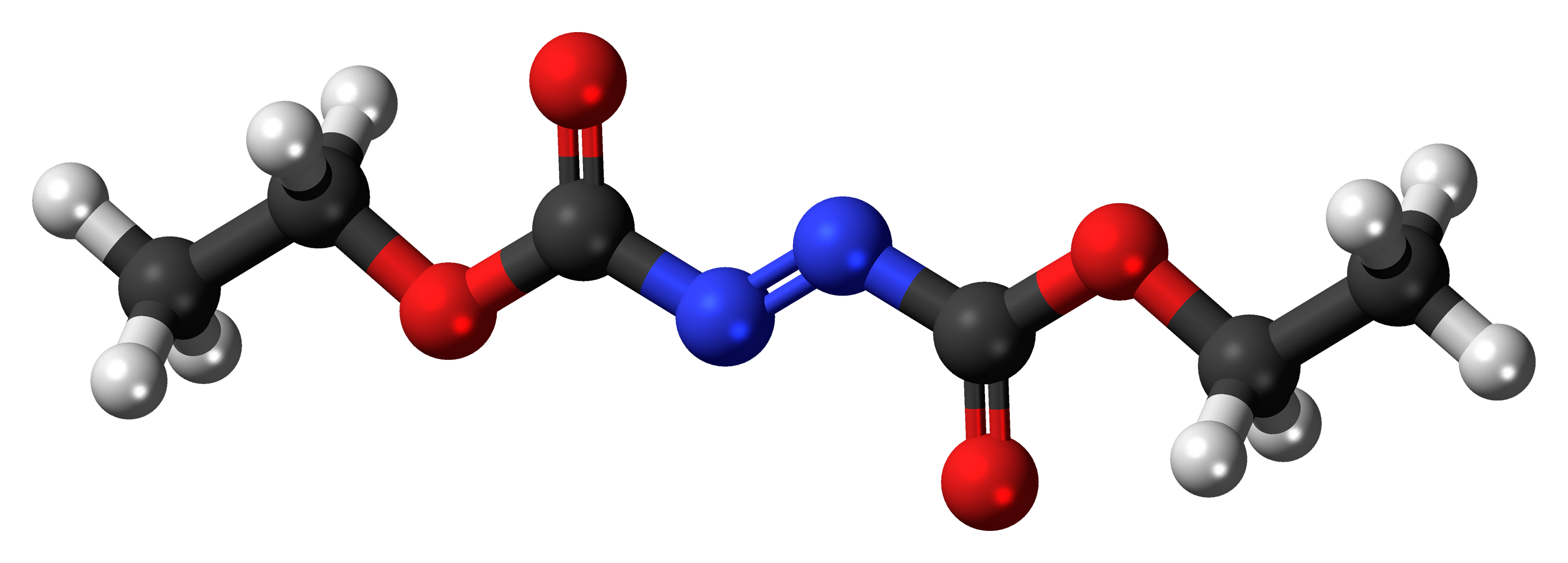

Names
- IUPAC name Diethyl diazenedicarboxylate
- Systematic IUPAC name Ethyl N-ethoxycarbonyliminocarbamate
- Other names: DEAD; DEADCAT; Diethyl azodiformate; Diazenedicarboxylic acid, diethyl ester

Identifiers
| CAS Number | 1972-28-7 |
| 3D model (JSmol) | Interactive image |
| ChemSpider | 4510444 |
| ECHA InfoCard | 100.016.202 |
| EC Number | 217-821-7 |
| PubChem CID | 220568 |
| UNII | D31B4839S8 |
| CompTox Dashboard (EPA) | DTXSID10194348 |
- InChI: InChI=1S/C6H10N2O4/c1-3-11-5(9)7-8-6(10)12-4-2/h3-4H2,1-2H3/b8-7+ Key: FAMRKDQNMBBFBR-BQYQJAHWSA-N; InChI=1/C6H10N2O4/c1-3-11-5(9)7-8-6(10)12-4-2/h3-4H2,1-2H3/b8-7+ Key: FAMRKDQNMBBFBR-BQYQJAHWBW
- SMILES: O=C(/N=N/C(=O)OCC)OCC

Properties
| Chemical formula | C_{6}H_{10}N_{2}O_{4} |
| Molar mass | 174.156 g·mol^{−1} |
| Appearance | Orange to red to orange liquid |
| Density | 1.11 g/cm^{3} |
| Melting point | 6 °C (43 °F; 279 K) |
| Boiling point | 104.5 °C (220.1 °F; 377.6 K) at 12 mm Hg |
| Refractive index (n_{D}) | 1.420 (20 °C) |

Hazards
- GHS labelling
| Pictograms | (GHS01: Explosive) (GHS07: Exclamation mark) |
| Signal word | Danger |
| Hazard statements | H240, H302, H312, H315, H319, H332, H335 |
| Precautionary statements | P210, P220, P234, P261, P264, P270, P271, P280, P301+P312, P302+P352, P304+P312, P304+P340, P305+P351+P338, P312, P321, P322, P330, P332+P313, P337+P313, P362, P363, P370+P378, P370+P380+P375, P403+P233, P403+P235, P405, P411, P420, P501 |
| Flash point | 85 °C (185 °F; 358 K) |
| Safety data sheet (SDS) | External MSDS |
- Except where otherwise noted, data are given for materials in their standard state (at 25 °C [77 °F], 100 kPa). verify (what is ?) Infobox references

Diethyl azodicarboxylate, conventionally abbreviated as DEAD and sometimes as DEADCAT, is an organic compound with the structural formula CH_{3}CH_{2}−O−C(=O)−N=N−C(=O)−O−CH_{2}CH_{3}. Its molecular structure consists of a central azo functional group, RN=NR, flanked by two ethyl ester groups. This orange-red liquid is a valuable reagent but also quite dangerous and explodes upon heating. Therefore, commercial shipment of pure diethyl azodicarboxylate is prohibited in the United States and is carried out either in solution or on polystyrene particles.

DEAD is an aza-dienophile and an efficient dehydrogenating agent, converting alcohols to aldehydes, thiols to disulfides and hydrazo groups to azo groups; it is also a good electron acceptor. While DEAD is used in numerous chemical reactions it is mostly known as a key component of the Mitsunobu reaction, a common strategy for the preparation of an amine, azide, ether, thioether, or ester from the corresponding alcohol. It is used in the synthesis of various natural products and pharmaceuticals such as zidovudine, an AIDS drug; FdUMP, a potent antitumor agent; and procarbazine, a chemotherapy drug.

== Properties ==
DEAD is an orange-red liquid which weakens its color to yellow or colorless upon dilution or chemical reaction. This color change is conventionally used for visual monitoring of the synthesis. DEAD dissolves in most common organic solvents, such as toluene, chloroform, ethanol, tetrahydrofuran and dichloromethane but has low solubility in water or carbon tetrachloride; the solubility in water is higher for the related azo compound dimethyl azodicarboxylate.

DEAD is a strong electron acceptor and easily oxidizes a solution of sodium iodide in glacial acetic acid. It also reacts vigorously with hydrazine hydrate producing diethyl hydrazodicarboxylate and evolving nitrogen. Linear combination of atomic orbitals molecular orbital method (LCAO-MO) calculations suggest that the molecule of DEAD is unusual in having a high-lying vacant bonding orbital, and therefore tends to withdraw hydrogen atoms from various hydrogen donors. Photoassisted removal of hydrogen by DEAD was demonstrated for isopropyl alcohol, resulting in pinacol and tetraethyl tetrazanetetracarboxylate, and for acetaldehyde yielding diacetyl and diethyl hydrazodicarboxylate. Similarly, reacting DEAD with ethanol and cyclohexanol abstracts hydrogen producing acetaldehyde and cyclohexanone. Those reactions also proceed without light, although at much lower yields. Thus, in general DEAD is an aza-dienophile and dehydrogenating agent, converting alcohols to aldehydes, thiols to disulfides and hydrazo groups to azo groups. It also undergoes pericyclic reactions with alkenes and dienes via ene and Diels–Alder mechanisms.

== Preparation ==
Although available commercially, diethyl azodicarboxylate can be prepared fresh in the laboratory, especially if required in pure, non-diluted form. A two-step synthesis starts from hydrazine, first by alkylation with ethyl chloroformate, followed by treating the resulting diethyl hydrazodicarboxylate with chlorine (bubbling through the solution), hypochlorous acid, concentrated nitric acid or red fuming nitric acid. The reaction is carried out in an ice bath, and the reagents are added dropwise so that the temperature does not rise above 20 °C. Diethyl hydrazodicarboxylate is a solid with melting temperature of 131–133 °C which is collected as a residue; it is significantly more stable to heating than DEAD and is conventionally dried at a temperature of about 80 °C.

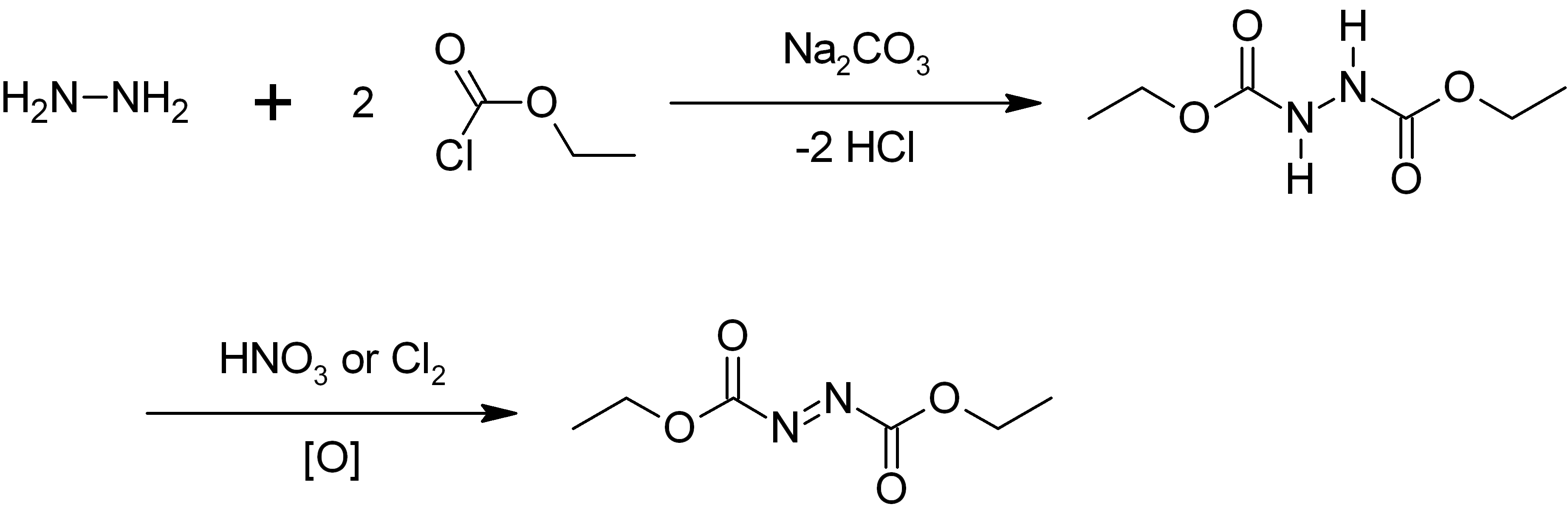

== Applications ==
=== Mitsunobu reaction ===
DEAD is a reagent in the Mitsunobu reaction where it forms an adduct with phosphines (usually triphenylphosphine) and assists the synthesis of esters, ethers, amines and thioethers from alcohols. Reactions normally result in the inversion of molecular symmetry.

DEAD was used in the original 1967 article by Oyo Mitsunobu, and his 1981 review on the use of diethyl azodicarboxylate is a top-cited chemistry article. The Mitsunobu reaction has several applications in the synthesis of natural products and pharmaceuticals.

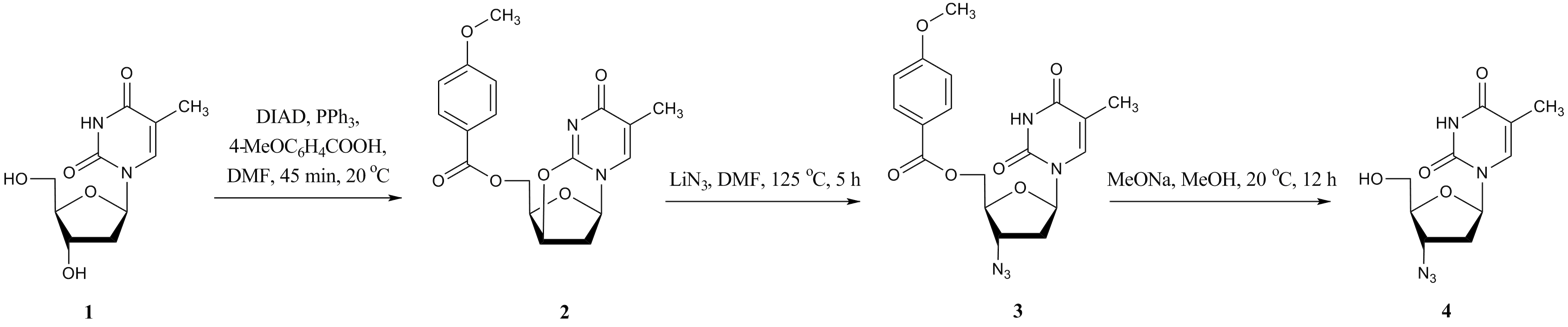

In the above reaction, which is assisted either by DEAD or DIAD (diisopropyl azodicarboxylate), thymidine 1 transforms to the derivative 2. The latter easily converts to zidovudine 4 (also known as azidothymidine or AZT), an important antiviral drug, used among others in the treatment of AIDS. Another example of pharmaceutical application of DEAD-assisted Mitsunobu reaction is the synthesis of bis[(pivaloyloxy)methyl [PIVz] derivative of 2'-deoxy-5-fluorouridine 5'-monophosphate (FdUMP), which is a potent antitumor agent.

=== Michael reaction ===
The azo group in DEAD is a Michael acceptor. In the presence of a copper(II) catalyst, DEAD assists conversion of β-keto esters to the corresponding hydrazine derivatives.

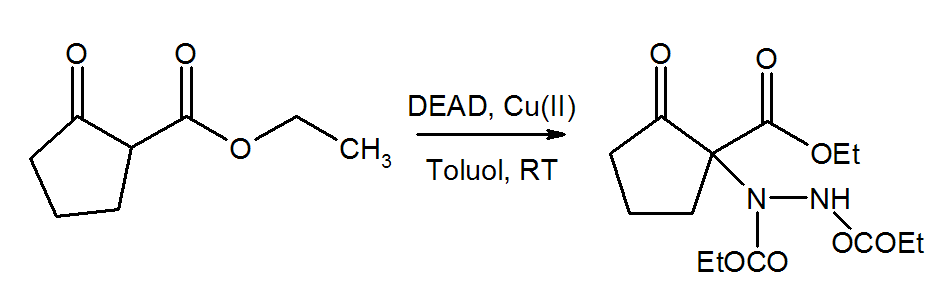

The substitution of boronic acid esters proceeds similarly:

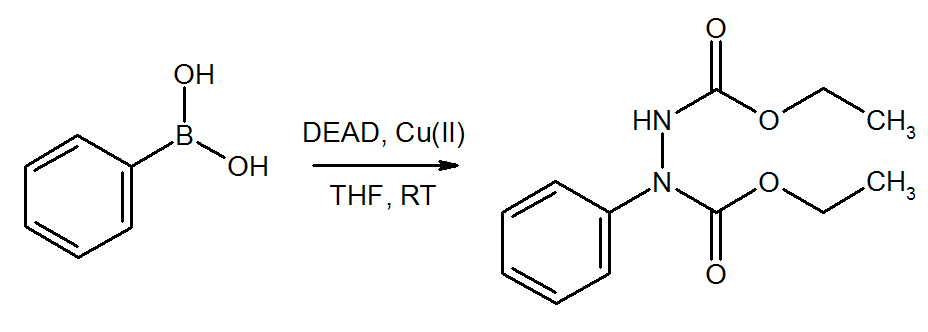

=== Other reactions ===
DEAD is an efficient component in Diels-Alder reactions and in click chemistry, for example the synthesis of bicyclo[2.1.0]pentane, which originates from Otto Diels. It has also been used to generate aza-Baylis-Hillman adducts with acrylates.

DEAD can be used for synthesis of heterocyclic compounds. Thus, pyrazoline derivatives convert by condensation to α,β-unsaturated ketones:

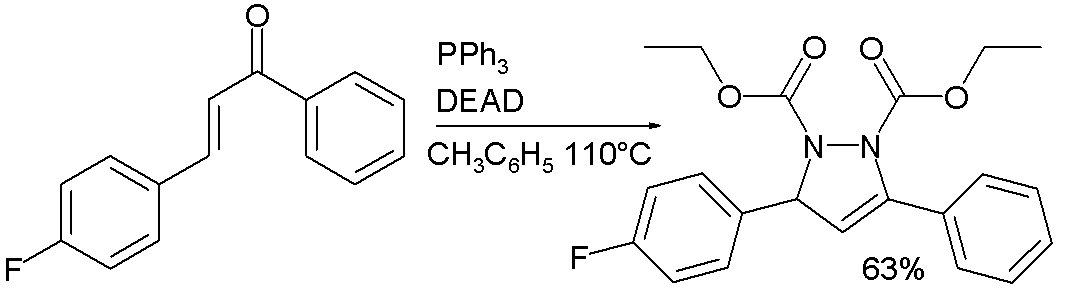

Another application is the use of DEAD as an enophile in ene reactions:

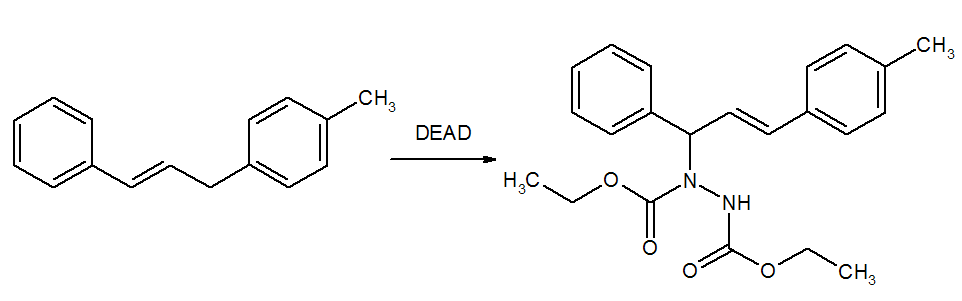

== Safety ==
DEAD is toxic, shock and light sensitive; it can violently explode when its undiluted form is heated above 100 °C. Shipment by air of pure diethyl azodicarboxylate is prohibited in the United States and is carried out in solution, typically about 40% DEAD in toluene. Alternatively, DEAD is transported and stored on 100–300 mesh polystyrene particles at a concentration of about 1 mmol/g. The time-weighed average threshold limit value for exposure to DEAD over a typical 40-hour working week is 50 parts per million; that is, DEAD is half as toxic as, e.g., carbon monoxide. Safety hazards have resulted in rapid decline of DEAD usage and replacement with DIAD and other similar compounds.
