= Mitsunobu reaction =

Chemical reaction

Named after	Oyo Mitsunobu
Reaction type	Coupling reaction

Identifiers
Organic Chemistry Portal	mitsunobu-reaction
RSC ontology ID	RXNO:0000034

The Mitsunobu reaction is an organic reaction that converts an alcohol into a variety of functional groups, such as an ester, using triphenylphosphine and an azodicarboxylate such as diethyl azodicarboxylate (DEAD) or diisopropyl azodicarboxylate (DIAD). Although DEAD and DIAD are most commonly used, there are a variety of other azodicarboxylates available which facilitate an easier workup and/or purification and in some cases, facilitate the use of more basic nucleophiles. It was discovered by Oyo Mitsunobu (1934–2003). In a typical procedure, the alcohol, carboxylic acid, and triphenylphosphine are dissolved in tetrahydrofuran or other suitable solvent (e.g. diethyl ether), cooled to 0 °C using an ice-bath, a THF solution of the azodicarboxylate is then added slowly, and the reaction stirred at room temperature for several hours. The alcohol reacts with the phosphine to create a good leaving group then undergoes an inversion of stereochemistry in classic S_{N}2 fashion as the nucleophile displaces it. A common side-product is produced when the azodicarboxylate displaces the leaving group instead of the desired nucleophile. This happens if the nucleophile is not acidic enough (pK_{a} larger than 13) or is not nucleophilic enough due to steric or electronic constraints. A variation of this reaction utilizing a nitrogen nucleophile is known as a Fukuyama–Mitsunobu.

The Mitsunobu reaction

Several reviews have been published.

== Reaction mechanism ==
The reaction mechanism of the Mitsunobu reaction is fairly complex. The identity of intermediates and the roles they play has been the subject of debate.

Initially, the triphenyl phosphine (2) makes a nucleophilic attack upon diethyl azodicarboxylate (1) producing a betaine intermediate 3, which deprotonates the carboxylic acid (4) to form the ion pair 5. The formation of the ion pair 5 is very fast. The carboxylate ion deprotonates the alcohol (6), forming an alkoxide ion that attacks the phosphonium group in 5 to form the key alkoxyphosphonium ion 8.

This step is relatively slow, with rate strongly dependent on the basicity of the carboxylate counterion in the reaction medium. The molar ratio of carboxylic acid to DEAD and TPP also influences the step's rate and yield. In aprotic solvents, excess carboxylic acid reacts with carboxylate to form the hydrogen-bonded species [RC(O)O···H···OC(O)R]^{−}. While this species has lower basicity, reducing the rate of formation of 8, it also has markedly lower nucleophilicity, inhibiting the attack of carboxylate on the phosphonium group in 5 that would otherwise lead to the formation of an acylhydrazine side product.

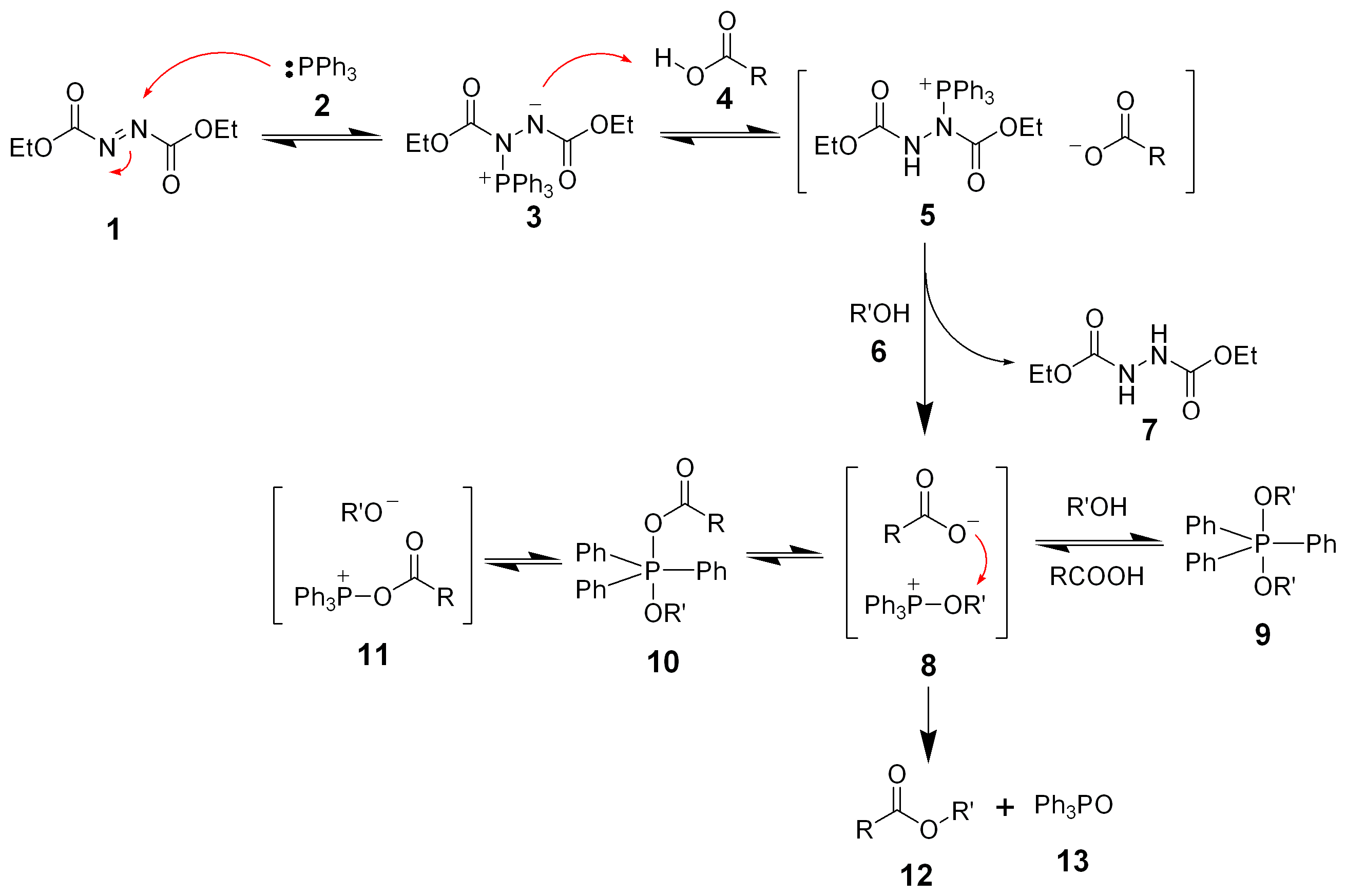
The mechanism of the Mitsunobu reaction

The second phase of the mechanism is proposed to be phosphorus-centered, the DEAD having been converted to the hydrazine 7. The ratio and interconversion of intermediates 8–11 depend on the carboxylic acid pK_{a} and the solvent polarity. Although several phosphorus intermediates are present, the attack of the carboxylate anion upon intermediate 8 is the only productive pathway forming the desired product 12 and triphenylphosphine oxide (13). Because triphenylphosphine oxide is a very good leaving group, the rate of this S_{N}2 reaction is only weakly dependent on carboxylate nucleophilicity.

The overall reaction rate, as well as which step is rate-determining, is dependent on the basicity of the carboxylate counterion. For weak bases such as dichloroacetate, formation of the alkoxyphosphonium species 8 is the slowest step. For relatively strong bases such as acetate, attack of the carboxylate anion upon 8 is instead the rate-determining step.

=== Order of addition of reagents ===
The order of addition of the reagents of the Mitsunobu reaction can be important. Typically, one dissolves the alcohol, the carboxylic acid, and triphenylphosphine in tetrahydrofuran or other suitable solvent (e.g. diethyl ether), cool to 0 °C using an ice-bath, slowly add the DEAD dissolved in THF, then stir at room temperature for several hours. If this is unsuccessful, then preforming the betaine may give better results. To preform the betaine, add DEAD to triphenylphosphine in tetrahydrofuran at 0 °C, followed by the addition of a mixture of the alcohol and acid.

== Variations ==
=== Other nucleophilic functional groups ===
Many other functional groups can serve as nucleophiles besides carboxylic acids. For the reaction to be successful, the nucleophile must have a pK_{a} less than 15.

Nucleophile	Product
hydrazoic acid	alkyl azide
imide	substituted imide
phenol	alkyl aryl ether (discovered independently)
sulfonamide	substituted sulfonamide
arylsulfonylhydrazine	alkyldiazene (subject to pericyclic or free radical dediazotization to give allene (Myers allene synthesis) or alkane (Myers deoxygenation), respectively)

=== Modifications ===
Several modifications to the original reagent combination have been developed in order to simplify the separation of the product and avoid production of so much chemical waste. One variation of the Mitsunobu reaction uses resin-bound triphenylphosphine and uses di-tert-butylazodicarboxylate instead of DEAD. The oxidized triphenylphosphine resin can be removed by filtration, and the di-tert-butylazodicarboxylate byproduct is removed by treatment with trifluoroacetic acid. Bruce H. Lipshutz has developed an alternative to DEAD, di-(4-chlorobenzyl)azodicarboxylate (DCAD) where the hydrazine by-product can be easily removed by filtration and recycled back to DCAD.

A modification has also been reported in which DEAD can be used in catalytic versus stoichiometric quantities, however this procedure requires the use of stoichiometric (diacetoxyiodo)benzene to oxidise the hydrazine by-product back to DEAD.

Denton and co-workers have reported a redox-neutral variant of the Mitsunobu reaction which employs a phosphorus(III) catalyst to activate the substrate, ensuring inversion in the nucleophilic attack, and uses a Dean-Stark trap to remove the water by-product.

=== Phosphorane reagents ===
Tsunoda et al. have demonstrated that a phosphorane ylide can provide the functionality of both the triphenylphosphine and azodicarboxylate in one reagent. Both (cyanomethylene)trimethylphosphorane (CMMP, R = Me) and (cyanomethylene)tributylphosphorane (CMBP, R = Bu) have proven particularly effective.

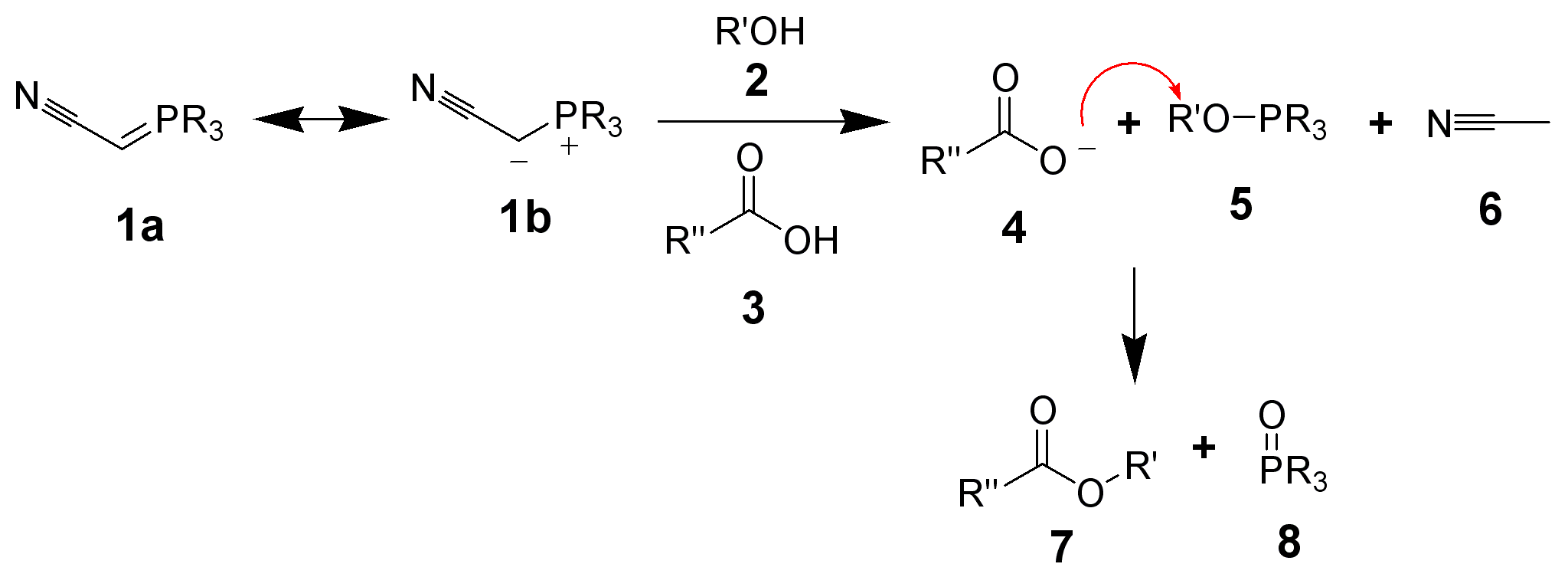
The mechanism of the phosphorane variant of the Mitsunobu reaction

The ylide acts as both the reducing agent and the base. The byproducts are acetonitrile (6) and the trialkylphosphine oxide (8).

== Uses ==
The Mitsunobu reaction has been applied in the synthesis of aryl ethers:

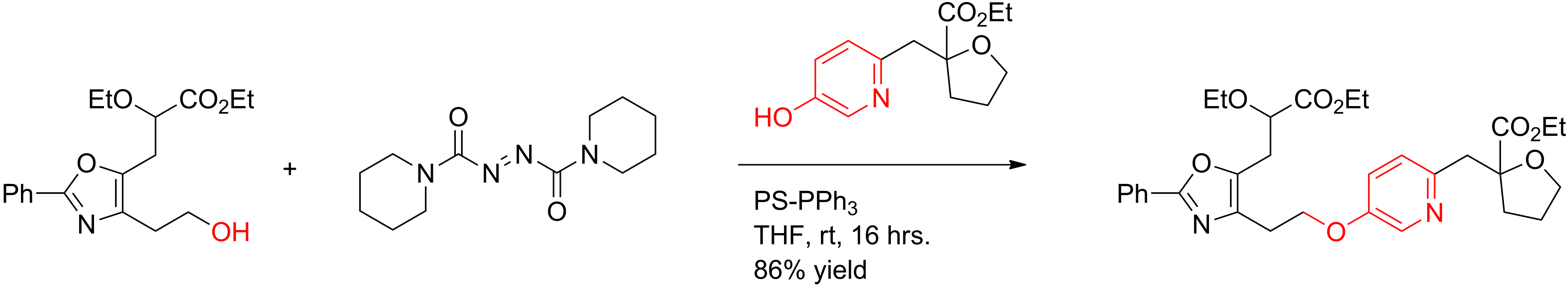

With these particular reactants the conversion with DEAD fails because the hydroxyl group is only weakly acidic. Instead the related 1,1'-(azodicarbonyl)dipiperidine (ADDP) is used of which the betaine intermediate is a stronger base. The phosphine is a polymer-supported triphenylphosphine (PS-PPh_{3}).

The reaction has been used to synthesize quinine, colchicine, sarain, morphine, stigmatellin, eudistomin, oseltamivir, strychnine, and nupharamine.

== See also ==
- Dehydration reaction — broader category of reactions
- Appel reaction — prior reaction superseded by the Mitsonobu conditions
- Burgess reagent — another dehydrating agent for sensitive molecules
