= Millon's reagent =

Reagent used to detect water soluble proteins

Millon's reagent is an analytical reagent used to detect the presence of soluble proteins. A few drops of the reagent are added to the test solution, which is then heated gently. A reddish-brown coloration or precipitate indicates the presence of tyrosine residue which occur in nearly all proteins. The test was developed by the French chemist Auguste Nicolas Eugene Millon. The structure of the metal complex is usually misrepresented. It is a nitroso complex, with M-N bonds.

Proposed formation of nitrosophenol ligand in the early stages of the Millon test.

The reagent is made by dissolving metallic mercury in nitric acid and diluting with water, forming mercuric nitrate (Hg(NO_{3})_{2}). In the test, the phenol group in the side chain of tyrosine is nitrated, and that product then complexes with Hg(I) or Hg(II) ions to give a red colored precipitate. Millon's test is not specific for proteins; it also gives a positive test for other compounds containing the phenol functional group. Therefore, the biuret test or the ninhydrin reaction are used along with it to confirm the presence of proteins.

== See also ==
- Benedict's reagent
