= Elastolefin =

Polymer

Elastolefin is a fiber composed of at least 95% (by weight) of macromolecules partially cross-linked, made of ethylene and at least one other olefin. When stretched to one and a half times its original length, it recovers rapidly to its original length. It therefore will stretch up to 50% and recover. Recent updates to EU fabric labelling directive to include elastolefin in Annex I and II. Low crystallinity polyolefin elastomers that have a cross-linked structure have been developed by the DOW Chemical Company in 2002. The trade name of the elastolefin fibers is DOW XLA, the fibers when under lower stress have the ability to expand when larger strains are applied. The DOW XLA fibers were designed to have high thermal and chemical resistance, stretch performance, and durability.
