= FKM =

Material

FKM is a family of fluorocarbon-based fluoroelastomer materials commonly called fluorine rubber or fluoro-rubber. FKM is an abbreviation of Fluorkautschukmaterial (i.e. fluorine rubber material). All FKMs contain vinylidene fluoride as the common monomer, to which different other monomers are added for specific types and functionalities, fitting the desired application.

Fluoroelastomers are more expensive than neoprene or nitrile rubber elastomers, and in comparison they provide additional resistance to heat and chemicals. There are three ways that the FKMs can be separated into classes: by their chemical composition, their fluorine content, or their cross-linking mechanism.

== Major Producers ==
Originally developed by DuPont (under the brand name Viton, now owned by Chemours), FKMs are today also produced by many other companies, including Daikin (Dai-El), 3M (Dyneon), Solvay S.A. (Tecnoflon), HaloPolymer (Elaftor), Gujarat Fluorochemicals (Fluonox), and several Chinese manufacturers.

== Standardization ==
Standards for FKM materials are defined by ASTM International standard D1418 and ISO standard 1629.

== Cross-linking mechanisms ==
There are three established cross-linking mechanisms used in the curing process of FKMs.

- Diamine cross-linking using a blocked diamine. In the presence of basic (alkaline) media, VDF is vulnerable to dehydrofluorination, which enables the addition of the diamine to the polymer chain. Typically, magnesium oxide is used to neutralize the resulting hydrofluoric acid and rearrange into magnesium fluoride and water. Although rarely used today, diamine curing provides superior rubber-to-metal bonding properties as compared with other cross-linking mechanisms. The diamine's capability to be hydrated makes the diamine cross-link vulnerable in aqueous media.
- Ionic cross-linking (dihydroxy cross-linking) was the next step in curing FKMs. This is the most common cross-linking chemistry used for FKMs today. It provides superior heat resistance, improved hydrolytic stability and better compression set than diamine curing. In contrast to diamine curing, the ionic mechanism is not an addition mechanism but an aromatic nucleophilic substitution. Dihydroxy aromatic compounds are used as the cross-linking agent, and quaternary phosphonium salts are typically used to accelerate the curing process.
- Peroxide cross-linking was originally developed for FKMs containing PMVE as diamine and bis-phenolic cross-linking systems can lead to cleavage in a polymer backbone chain containing PMVE. While diamine and bisphenolic cross-linking are ionic reactions, peroxide cross-linking is a free-radical mechanism. Though peroxide cross-links are not as thermally stable as bisphenolic cross-links, they normally are the system of choice in aqueous media and nonaqueous electrolyte media.

== Properties ==
Fluoroelastomers provide high temperature (up to 500 °F (260 °C)) and aggressive fluids resistance when compared with other elastomers, while combining the most effective stability to many sorts of chemicals and fluids such as oil, diesel, ethanol mix or body fluid.

The performance of fluoroelastomers in aggressive chemicals depends on the nature of the base polymer and the compounding ingredients used for molding the final products (e.g. o-rings). Some formulations are generally compatible with hydrocarbons, but incompatible with ketones such as acetone and methyl ethyl ketone, ester solvents such as ethyl acetate, amines, and organic acids such as acetic acid.

== Applications ==
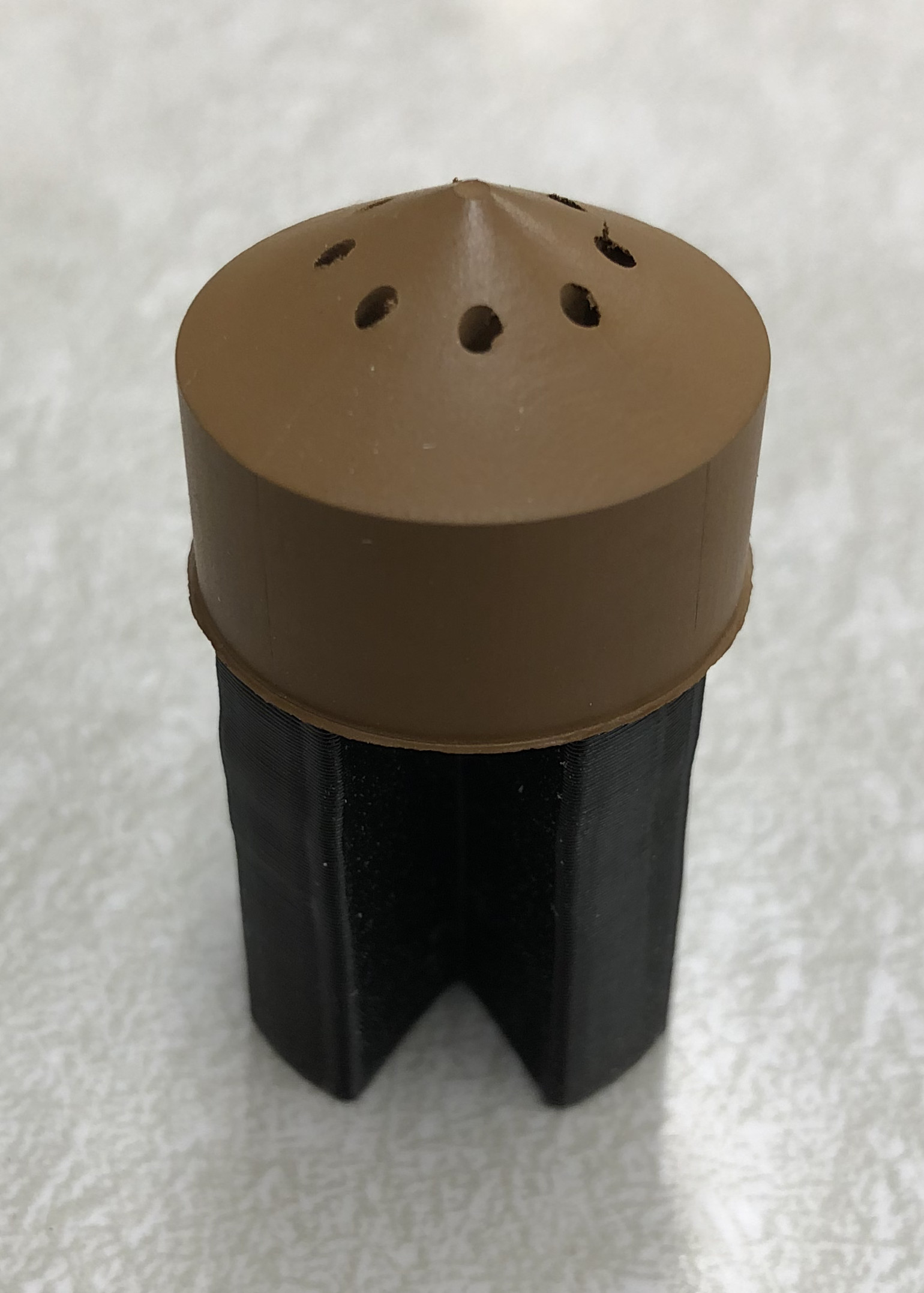
Example of FKM vacuum seal for use in ProtoDUNE-VD at CERN

Because of their outstanding performance they find use in a number of sectors, including the following:

- Chemical process and petroleum refining, where they are used for seals, pumps, and gaskets, due to their resistance to chemicals.
- Analysis and process instruments: separators, diaphragms, cylindrical fittings, hoops, gaskets, etc.
- Semiconductor manufacturing.
- Food and pharmaceutical, because of their low degradation.
- Aviation and aerospace: high operating temperatures and high altitudes require superior heat and low-temperature resistance.
- They are suitable for the production of wearables, due to low wear and discoloration even during prolonged lifetimes in contact with skin oils and frequent exposure to light, while guaranteeing high comfort and stain resistance.

The automotive industry represents their main application sector, where constant reach for higher efficiencies push manufacturers towards high-performing materials. An example are FKM o-rings used as an upgrade to the original neoprene seals on Corvair pushrod tubes that deteriorated under the high heat produced by the engine, allowing oil leakage. FKM tubing or lined hoses are commonly recommended in automotive and other transportation fuel applications when high concentrations of biodiesel are required. Studies indicate that types B and F (FKM- GBL-S and FKM-GF-S) are more resistant to acidic biodiesel. (This is because biodiesel fuel is unstable and oxidizing.)

FKM O-rings have been used safely for some time in scuba diving by divers using gas blends referred to as nitrox. FKMs are used because they have a lower probability of catching fire, even with the increased percentages of oxygen found in nitrox. They are also less susceptible to decay under increased oxygen conditions.

While these materials have a wide range of applications, their cost is prohibitive when compared to other types of elastomers, meaning that their adoption must be justified by the need for outstanding performance (as in the aerospace sector) and is inadvisable for low-cost products.

FKM rubber is widely used in the watch strap industry due to its superior resistance to chemicals, extreme temperatures, and wear. It is commonly found in premium aftermarket watch straps, offering durability and a comfortable fit.

FKM/butyl gloves are highly impermeable to many strong organic solvents that would destroy or permeate commonly used gloves (such as those made with nitriles).

== Precautions ==
At high temperatures or in a fire, fluoroelastomers decompose and may release hydrogen fluoride. Any residue must be handled using protective equipment.

== See also ==
- FFKM, perfluoro-elastomers
- FEPM, tetrafluoro ethylene/propylene elastomers
- PVDF, polyvinylidene fluoride
