= FFKM =

Type of elastomer

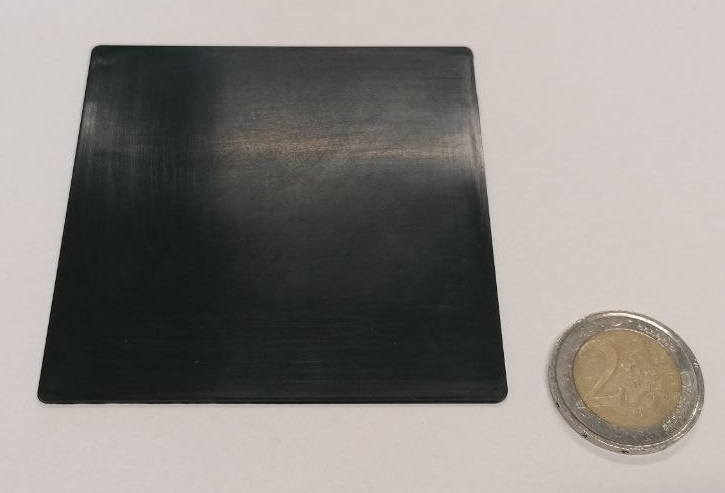
FFKM film

FFKMs (by ASTM 1418 standard) (equivalent to FFPMs by ISO/DIN 1629 standard) are perfluoroelastomeric compounds containing an even higher amount of fluorine than FKM fluoroelastomers.

They have improved resistance to high temperatures and chemicals and even withstand environments where oxygen-plasma are present for many hours. Certain grades have a maximum continuous service temperature of 327 °C (621 °F). They are commonly used to make O-rings and gaskets that are used in applications that involve contact with hydrocarbons or highly corrosive fluids, or when a wide range of temperatures is encountered.

For vacuum applications, demanding very low contamination (out-gassing and particle emission) as well as high temperature operation (200–300 °C) for prolonged out-baking or processing times and where a copper or metal sealing is not possible or very inconvenient/expensive, FFKM sealing brands such as Kalrez® , Chemraz®, Katon® or Perlast can be used. After manufacturing, they are O-plasma vacuum cleaned (and/or vacuum baked) to reach out-gassing performance similar to Teflon while reaching vacuum leak tightness (permeability rates) similar to FKM (Viton) compounds. This combination of properties allows FFKM seals to reach well into UHV pressures without the use of metal sealing. However, they are significantly more expensive than standard FKM o-rings.

== Limitations of FFKM ==
Perfluoroelastomers (FFKMs), while offering outstanding chemical and thermal resistance, have several limitations that restrict their broader use. They are among the most expensive elastomers due to complex synthesis, high fluorine content, and intensive processing requirements, making them suitable primarily for critical applications. FFKMs generally have poor flexibility at low temperatures, with glass transition temperatures typically around -20°C. Finally, although chemically resistant to a wide range of substances, FFKMs can still degrade in the presence of specific aggressive media, necessitating careful material selection for each application.

== Curing Systems in FFKM Compounds ==
Curing is a critical step in manufacturing FFKM elastomer parts, transforming the base polymer into a final product with usable mechanical properties. The curing system determines not only the material’s chemical and thermal stability but also its processing characteristics and suitability for specific applications.

FFKM materials are generally cured using one of three main systems:

1. Peroxide Curing

Peroxide curing is the most common method for FFKM formulations. It uses organic peroxides to initiate a free-radical reaction, leading to the formation of crosslinks between polymer chains.

2. Triazine Curing

Triazine curing involves the formation of crosslinks through the reaction of triazine compounds with perfluorinated vinyl groups in the polymer. This method is known for producing very pure, clean, and thermally stable elastomers.

3. Other special curing methods

Besides triazine and peroxide curing systems, several leading FFKM manufacturers have developed proprietary cross-linking technologies that remain undisclosed to the public.
