= Fluoroelastomer =

Class of chemical compounds

A fluoroelastomer is a fluorocarbon-based synthetic rubber. Fluoroelastomers generally have wide chemical resistance.

== Composition ==
Several compositions of fluoroelastomers exist including FKM (by ASTM D1418 standard, equivalent to FPM by ISO/DIN 1629 standard); perfluoro-elastomers (FFKM); and tetrafluoroethylene/propylene rubbers (FEPM).

== Performance ==
The performance of fluoroelastomers in aggressive chemicals depends on the nature of the base polymer and the compounding ingredients used for moulding the final products (e.g. O-rings, shaft seals). This performance can vary significantly when end-users purchase polymer-containing rubber goods from different sources. Fluoroelastomers are generally compatible with hydrocarbons, but incompatible with ketones such as acetone and organic acids such as acetic acid.
