= Woodward–Hoffmann rules =

Set of rules pertaining to pericyclic reactions

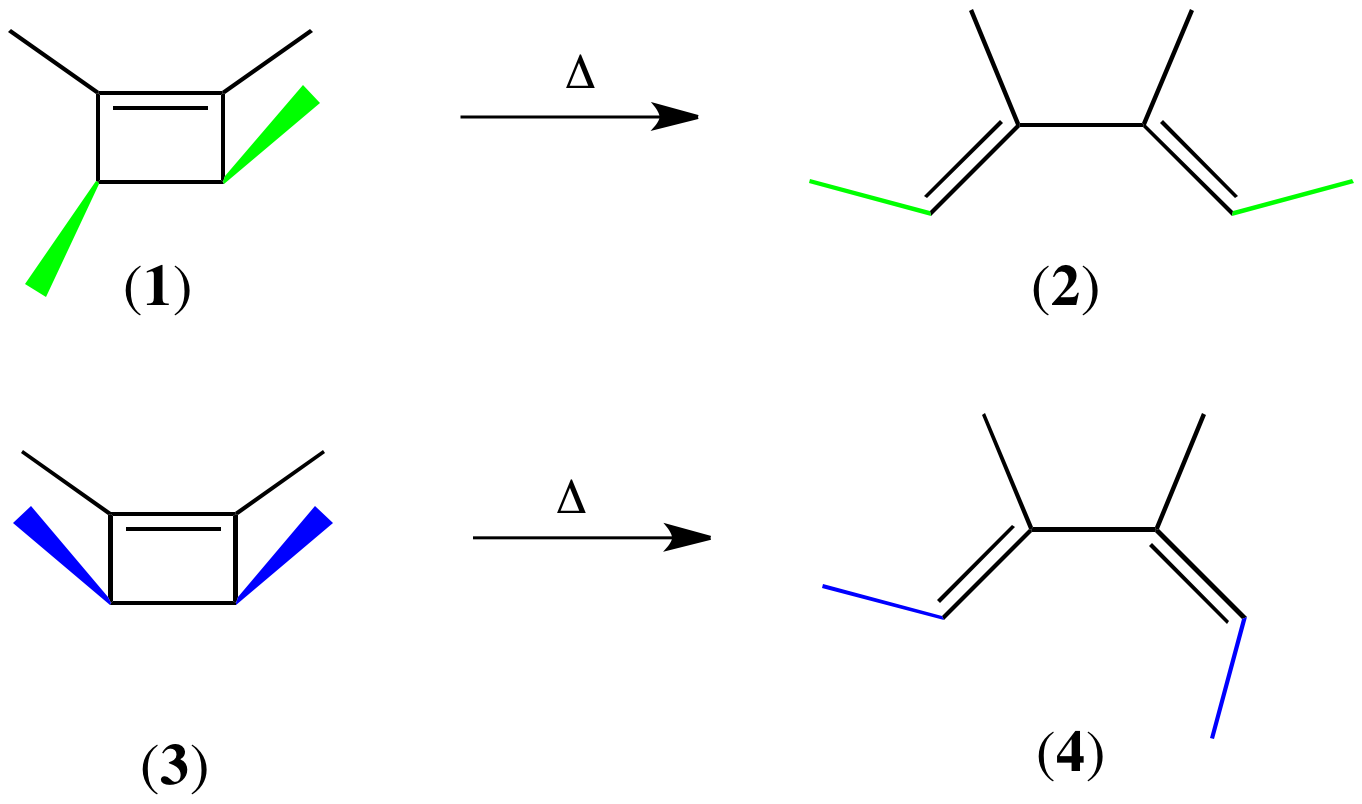
Thermolysis converts 1 to (E,E) geometric isomer 2, but 3 to (E,Z) isomer 4.

The Woodward–Hoffmann rules (or the pericyclic selection rules) are a set of rules devised by Robert Burns Woodward and Roald Hoffmann to rationalize or predict certain aspects of the stereochemistry and activation energy of pericyclic reactions, an important class of reactions in organic chemistry. The rules originate in certain symmetries of the molecule's orbital structure that any molecular Hamiltonian conserves. Consequently, any symmetry-violating reaction must couple extensively to the environment; this imposes an energy barrier on its occurrence, and such reactions are called symmetry-forbidden. Their opposites are symmetry-allowed.

Although the symmetry-imposed barrier is often formidable (up to c. 5 eV or 480 kJ/mol in the case of a forbidden [2+2] cycloaddition), the prohibition is not absolute, and symmetry-forbidden reactions can still take place if other factors (e.g. strain release) favor the reaction. Likewise, a symmetry-allowed reaction may be preempted by an insurmountable energetic barrier resulting from factors unrelated to orbital symmetry. All known cases only violate the rules superficially; instead, different parts of the mechanism become asynchronous, and each step conforms to the rules.

== Background and terminology ==
A pericyclic reaction is an organic reaction that proceeds via a single, concerted, cyclic transition state, the geometry of which allows for the continuous overlap of a cycle of (π and/or σ) orbitals.

The terms conrotatory and disrotatory describe the relative sense of bond rotation involved in electrocyclic ring-opening and -closing reactions. In a disrotatory process, the breaking or forming bond's two ends rotate in opposing directions (one clockwise, one counterclockwise); in a conrotatory process, they rotate in the same direction (both clockwise or both counterclockwise).

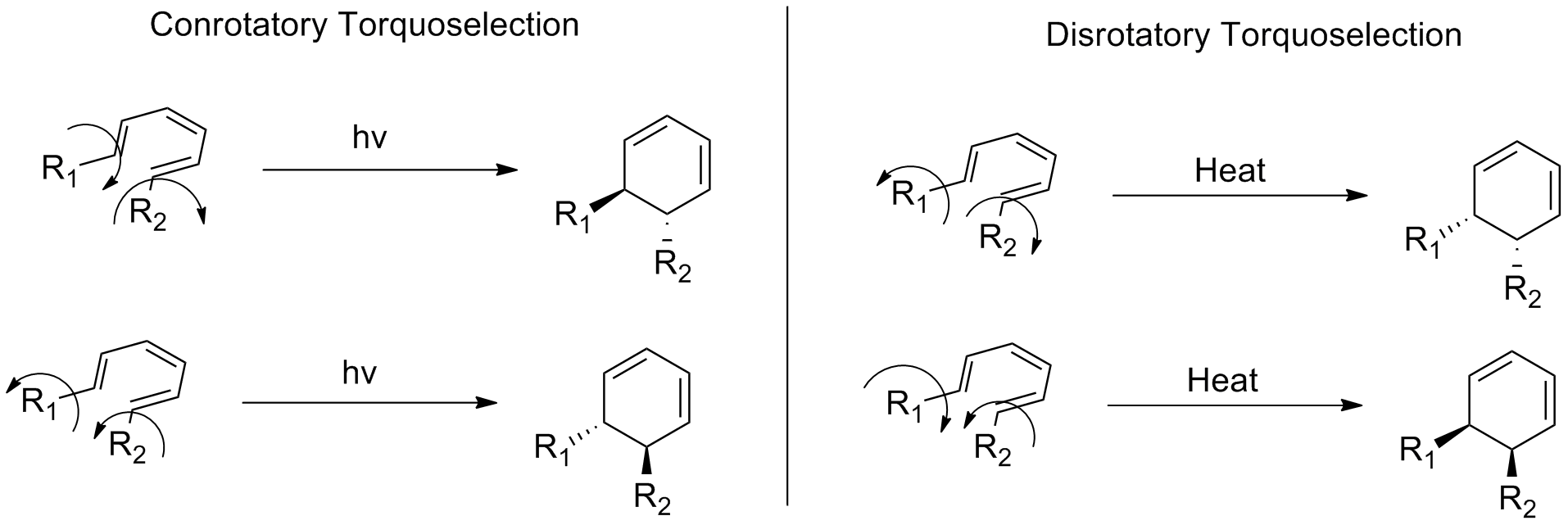

Eventually, it was recognized that thermally-promoted pericyclic reactions in general obey a single set of generalized selection rules, depending on the electron count and topology of the orbital interactions. The key concept of orbital topology or faciality was introduced to unify several classes of pericyclic reactions under a single conceptual framework. In short, a set of contiguous atoms and their associated orbitals that react as one unit in a pericyclic reaction is known as a component, and each component is said to be antarafacial or suprafacial depending on whether the orbital lobes that interact during the reaction are on the opposite or same side of the nodal plane, respectively. (The older terms conrotatory and disrotatory, which are applicable to electrocyclic ring opening and closing only, are subsumed by the terms antarafacial and suprafacial, respectively, under this more general classification system.)

== History ==
Woodward and Hoffmann developed the pericyclic selection rules as part of the broader community's effort to synthesize vitamin B_{12}. Woodward wanted to know whether certain electrocyclic reactions might help, as such reactions exhibited striking stereospecificity, but could not predict which stereoisomer a reaction might select. In 1961, E. Havinga had noted that tachysterol underwent electrocyclic ring-closure in a conrotatory or disrotatory manner depending on (respectively) photochemical or thermal activation, and moreover that the stereospecificity could be explained through orbital symmetry, but it was unclear how far such a principle might extend. Hence, Woodward and Hoffman began extensive orbital-overlap calculations to analyze the behavior of open-chain conjugated polyenes.

Soon, Woodward and Hoffman realized that a simple set of rules governed the observed stereospecificity. In their 1965 publication, they summarized the experimental evidence and molecular orbital analysis as follows:

- In an open-chain system containing 4n π electrons, the orbital symmetry of the highest occupied molecule orbital is such that a bonding interaction between the ends must involve overlap between orbital envelopes on opposite faces of the system and this can only be achieved in a conrotatory process.
- In open systems containing (4n + 2) π electrons, terminal bonding interaction within ground-state molecules requires overlap of orbital envelopes on the same face of the system, attainable only by disrotatory displacements.
- In a photochemical reaction an electron in the HOMO of the reactant is promoted to an excited state leading to a reversal of terminal symmetry relationships and stereospecificity.

In 1969, they would use correlation diagrams to state a generalized pericyclic selection rule equivalent to that now attached to their name: a pericyclic reaction is allowed if the sum of the number of suprafacial 4q + 2 components and number of antarafacial 4r components is odd. .

In the intervening four years, Howard Zimmerman and Michael J. S. Dewar proposed an equally general conceptual framework: the Möbius-Hückel concept, or aromatic transition state theory. In the Dewar-Zimmerman approach the orbital overlap topology (Hückel or Möbius) and electron count (4n + 2 or 4n) results in either an aromatic or antiaromatic transition state.

Meanwhile, Kenichi Fukui analyzed the frontier orbitals of such systems. A process in which the HOMO-LUMO interaction is constructive (results in a net bonding interaction) is favorable and considered symmetry-allowed, while a process in which the HOMO-LUMO interaction is non-constructive (results in bonding and antibonding interactions that cancel) is disfavorable and considered symmetry-forbidden.

Though conceptually distinct, aromatic transition state theory (Zimmerman and Dewar), frontier molecular orbital theory (Fukui), and orbital symmetry conservation (Woodward and Hoffmann) all make identical predictions. The Woodward–Hoffmann rules exemplify molecular orbital theory's power, and indeed helped demonstrate that useful chemical results could arise from orbital analysis. The discovery would earn Hoffmann and Fukui the 1981 Nobel Prize in Chemistry. By that time, Woodward had died, and so was ineligible for the prize.

=== Priority dispute ===
In a 2004 memoir, fellow Nobel Prize winner Elias James Corey attempted to claim that he originated Woodward and Hoffman's discoveries, and that Woodward neglected to credit him. In Corey's account, Corey visited Woodward's office around 8:30 p.m on Monday, May 4, 1964, before leaving for home. Woodward asked how to predict the type of ring a chain of atoms would form, and Corey suggested that the configuration of electrons could govern the course of the reaction. Woodward insisted the solution would not work, but Corey left drawings in the office, still confident in the suggestion. The next day, Woodward, excited, flew into Corey's office at lunchtime and presented Corey's idea as his own.

Corey's claim is generally not credited. Hoffmann, Woodward's coworker, notes that Woodward presented "the crucial flash of enlightenment...in algebraic, rather than in pictorial or geometric form", which would be inconsistent with Corey's claims to a geometrical hint. Moreover, Corey relied on a stereospecific, electrocyclic reaction in a total synthesis published slightly before Woodward and Hoffmann's original publication:

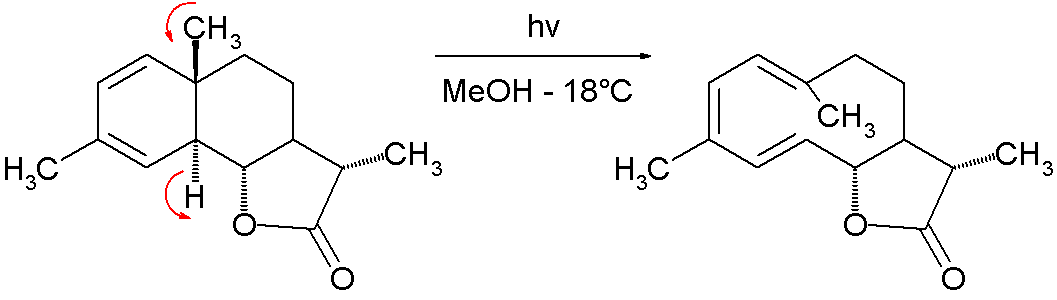
Stereospecific, electrocyclic reaction step in Corey 1963 dihydrocostunolide synthesis

If Corey had been thinking about the Woodward–Hoffmann rules around that time, he would have discussed the stereochemistry of the key electrocyclic reaction in his publication. Instead, Corey elided the matter.

== Rule ==
The Woodward–Hoffmann rules can be stated succinctly as a single sentence:

A ground-state pericyclic process involving N electron pairs and A antarafacial components is symmetry-allowed if and only if N + A is odd.

A ground-state pericyclic process is driven by surplus thermal energy (i.e., heat).

In the language of aromatic transition state theory, the Woodward–Hoffmann rules can be restated as follows:

A pericyclic transition state involving (4n + 2) electrons with Hückel topology or 4n electrons with Möbius topology is aromatic and allowed, while a pericyclic transition state involving 4n-electrons with Hückel topology or (4n + 2)-electrons with Möbius topology is antiaromatic and forbidden.

Often, the Woodward–Hoffmann rules are extended to analyze photochemical reactions, in which the surplus energy is provided by ultraviolet irradiation. If such processes occur purely in the excited state, then the Woodward–Hoffmann rules predict the exact reverse of the selection rule displayed above; that is:

A pericyclic process involving N electron pairs and A antarafacial components is often favored under photochemical conditions if N + A is even.

This can be rationalized by considering the correlation of the first electronic excited states of the reactants and products.

However, many formally pericyclic reactions taking place under photochemical irradiation exhibit complex mechanisms. Several modes of electronic excitation are usually possible, and electronically excited molecules may undergo intersystem crossing, radiationless decay, or relax to an unfavorable equilibrium geometry before the excited-state pericyclic process can take place. Thus, many apparent pericyclic reactions that take place under irradiation are actually thought to be stepwise processes involving diradical intermediates. Nevertheless, it is frequently observed that the pericyclic selection rules become reversed when switching from thermal to photochemical activation.

Pericyclic reactions involving an odd number of electrons are also known. With respect to application of the generalized pericyclic selection rule, these systems can generally be treated as though one more electron were involved.

== Illustrative examples ==
The interconversion of model cyclobutene and butadiene derivatives under thermal (heating) and photochemical (Ultraviolet irradiation) conditions is illustrative.

The Woodward–Hoffmann rules apply to either direction of a pericyclic process. Due to the inherent ring strain of cyclobutene derivatives, the thermodynamic equilibrium between the cyclobutene and the 1,3-butadiene strongly favors opening the ring. Irradiation causes reactions that can absorb photons to occur at a much faster rate and reactions that emit them occur more slowly, shifting the equilibrium to a photostationary state. Only the 1,3-butadiene absorbs significantly at higher wavelengths; hence, irradiation of the 1,3-butadiene at such a wavelength can result in high conversion to the cyclobutene.

Thermolysis of trans-1,2,3,4-tetramethyl-1-cyclobutene (1) afforded only one geometric isomer, (E,E)-3,4-dimethyl-2,4-hexadiene (2); the (Z,Z) and the (E,Z) geometric isomers were not detected in the product mixture. Similarly, thermolysis of cis-1,2,3,4-tetramethyl-1-cyclobutene (3) afforded only (E,Z) isomer 4. In both ring opening reactions, the carbons on the ends of the breaking σ-bond rotate in the same direction.

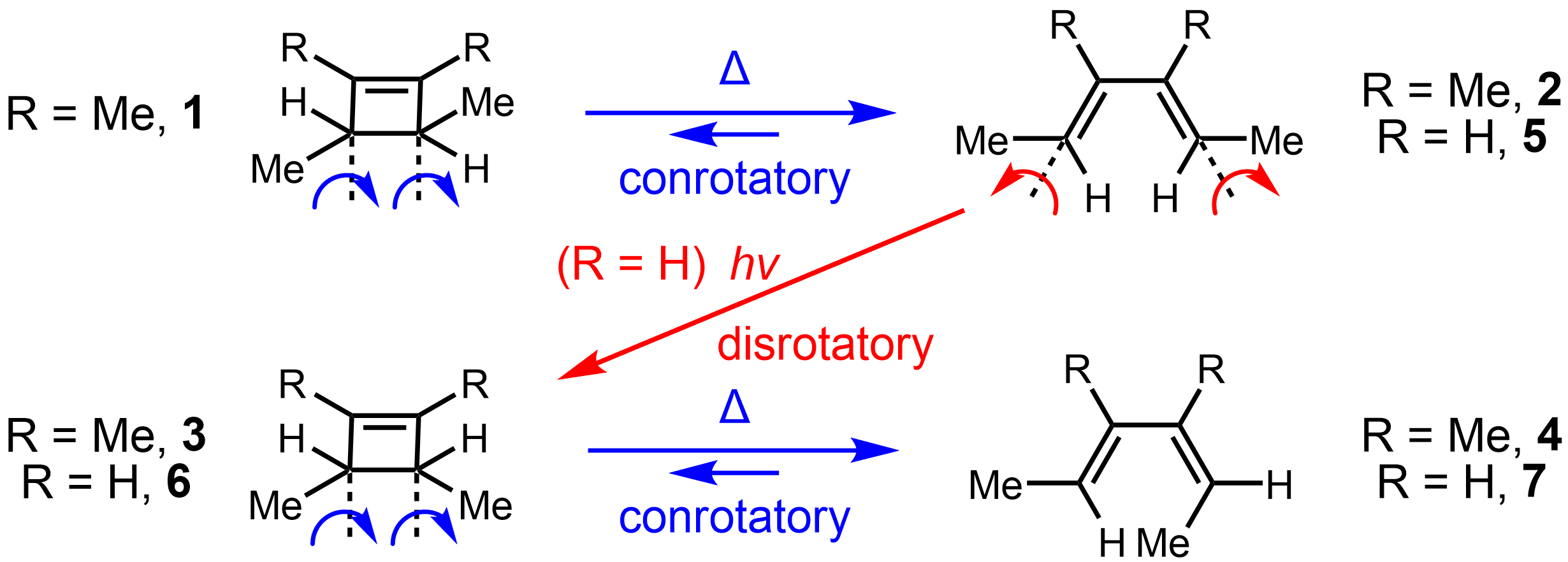
Some thermal and photochemical interconversions of substituted cyclobutenes and butadienes showing conrotatory (blue) and disrotatory (red) behavior.

On the other hand, the opposite stereochemical course was followed under photochemical activation: When the related compound (E,E)-2,4-hexadiene (5) was exposed to light, cis-3,4-dimethyl-1-cyclobutene (6) was formed exclusively as a result of electrocyclic ring closure. This requires the ends of the π-system to rotate in opposite directions to form the new σ-bond. Thermolysis of 6 follows the same stereochemical course as 3: electrocyclic ring opening leads to the formation of (E,Z)-2,4-hexadiene (7) and not 5.

The Woodward-Hoffmann rules explain these results through orbital overlap:

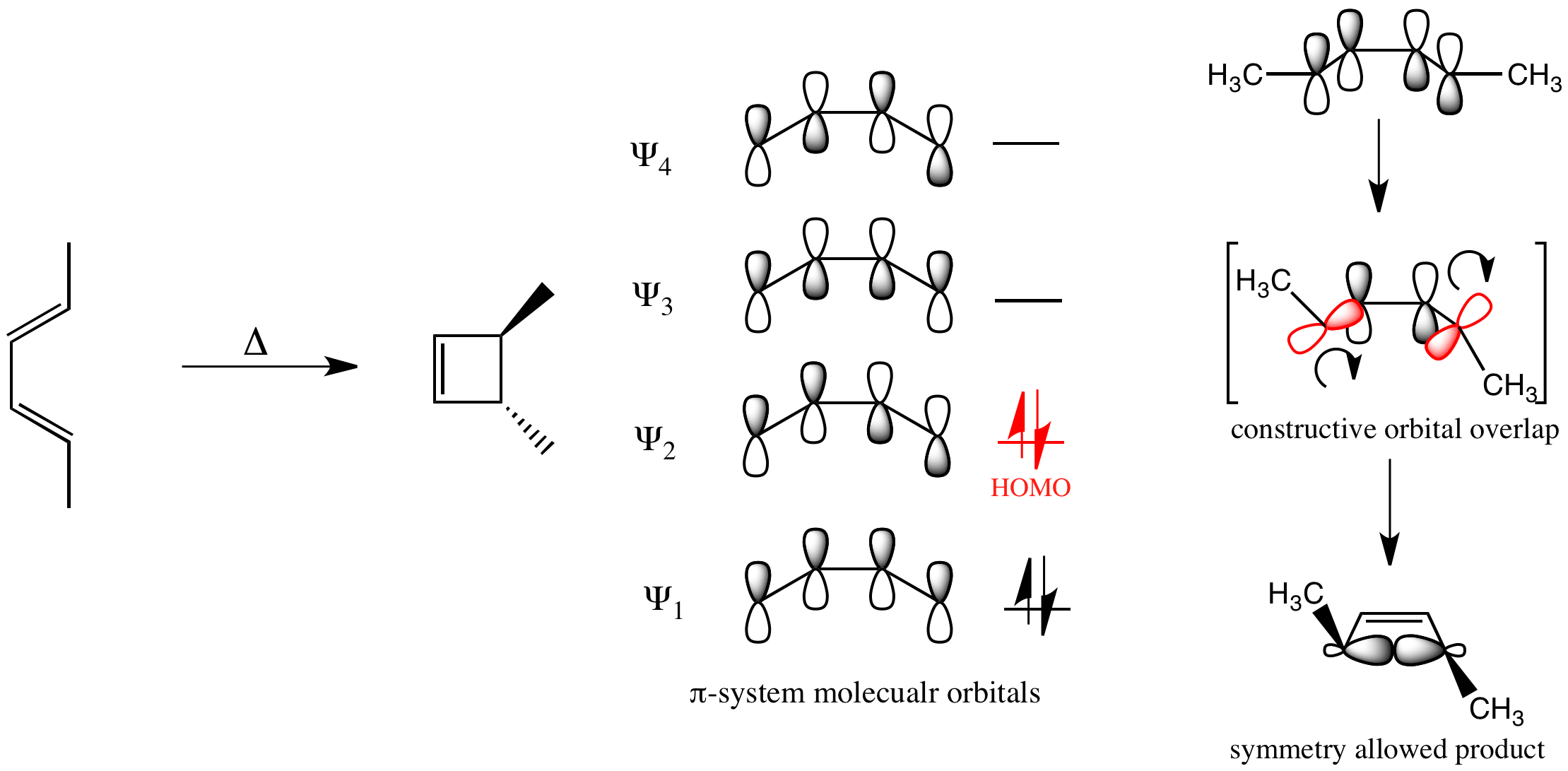

In the case of a photochemically driven electrocyclic ring-closure of buta-1,3-diene, electronic promotion causes $\Psi_3$ to become the HOMO and the reaction mechanism must be disrotatory.

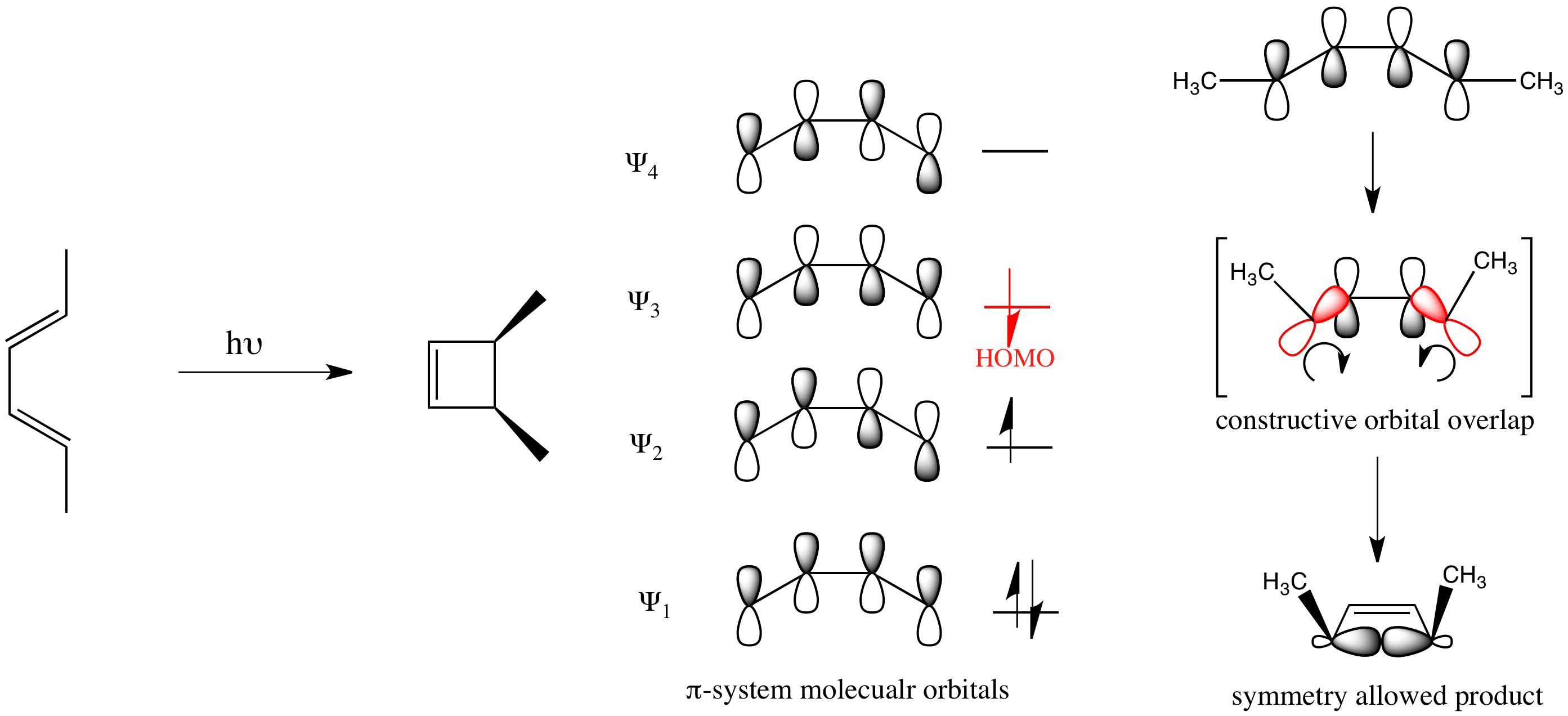

Conversely in the electrocyclic ring-closure of the substituted hexa-1,3,5-triene pictured below, the reaction proceeds through a disrotatory mechanism.

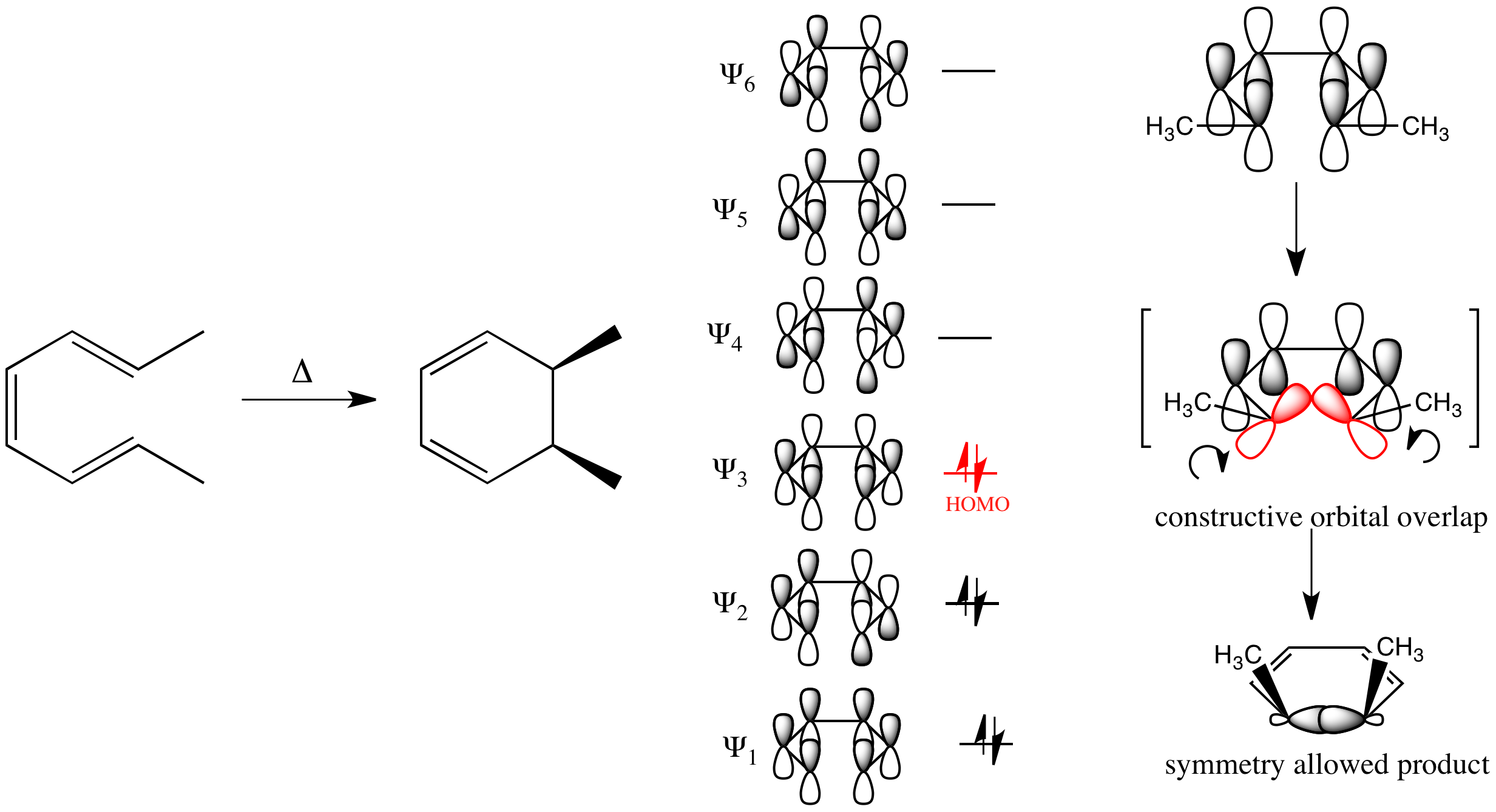

== Correlation diagrams ==
As shown by Longuet-Higgins and E. W. Abrahamson, the Woodward–Hoffmann rules can best be derived by examining the correlation diagram of a given reaction. In this approach the idea of a conserved symmetry element is introduced. A symmetry element is usually a plane or a line about which an object is symmetric or antisymmetric with respect to a rotation or reflection symmetry operation. If a symmetry element is present throughout the reaction path (from reactant, through transition state, to product), it is called a conserved symmetry element. Then, throughout the reaction, the symmetry of molecular orbitals with respect to this element must be conserved. That is, molecular orbitals that are symmetric with respect to the symmetry element in the starting material must be correlated to (transform into) orbitals symmetric with respect to that element in the product. Conversely, the same statement holds for antisymmetry with respect to a conserved symmetry element. A molecular orbital correlation diagram correlates molecular orbitals of the starting materials and the product based upon conservation of symmetry. From a molecular orbital correlation diagram one can construct an electronic state correlation diagram that correlates electronic states (i.e. ground state, and excited states) of the reactants with electronic states of the products. Correlation diagrams can then be used to predict the height of transition state barriers.

=== Electrocyclic reactions ===
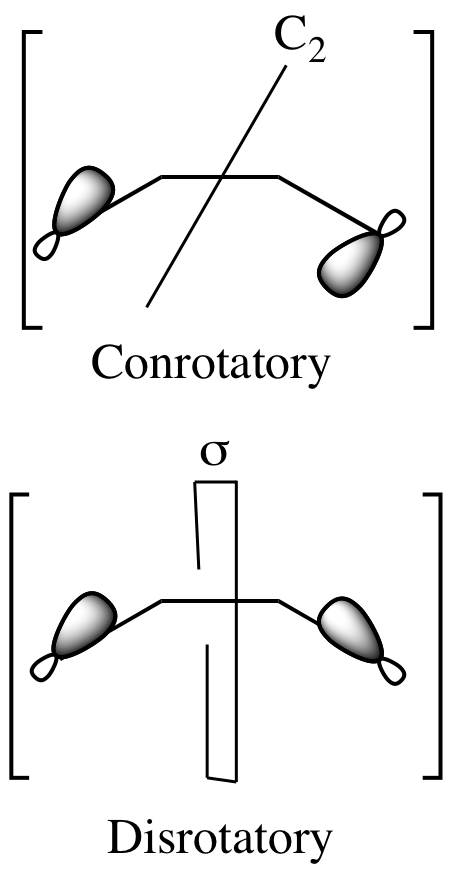
The transition state of a conrotatory closure has C_{2} symmetry, whereas the transition state of a disrotatory opening has mirror symmetry.

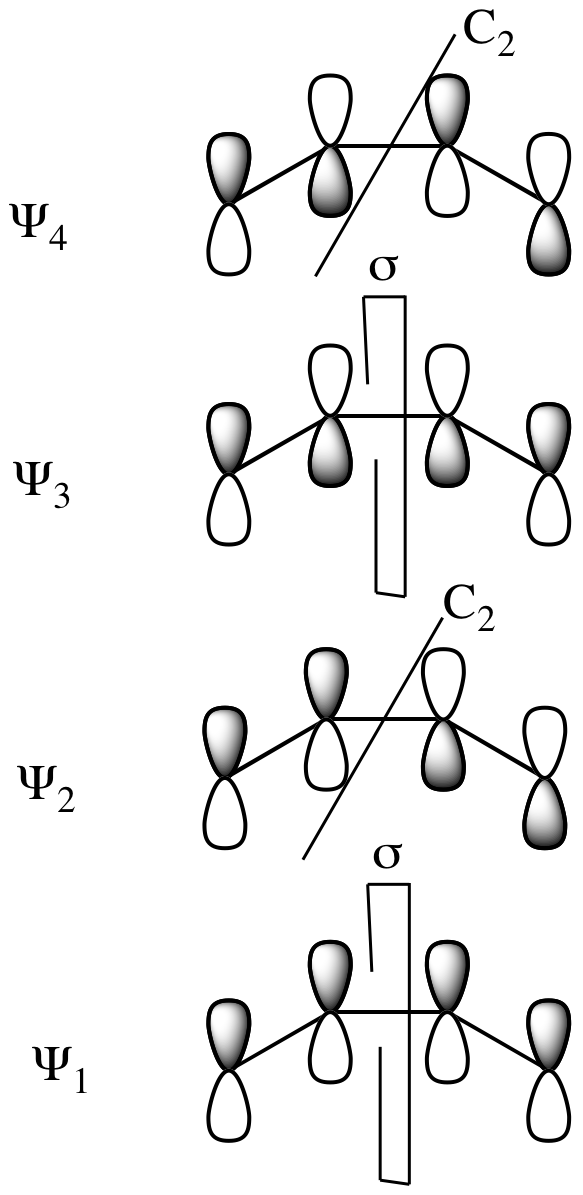
MOs of butadiene are shown with the element with which they are symmetric. They are antisymmetric with respect to the other.

Considering the electrocyclic ring closure of the substituted 1,3-butadiene, the reaction can proceed through either a conrotatory or a disrotatory reaction mechanism. As shown to the left, in the conrotatory transition state there is a C_{2} axis of symmetry and in the disrotatory transition state there is a σ mirror plane of symmetry. In order to correlate orbitals of the starting material and product, one must determine whether the molecular orbitals are symmetric or antisymmetric with respect to these symmetry elements. The π-system molecular orbitals of butadiene are shown to the right along with the symmetry element with which they are symmetric. They are antisymmetric with respect to the other. For example, Ψ_{2} of 1,3-butadiene is symmetric with respect to 180^{o} rotation about the C_{2} axis, and antisymmetric with respect to reflection in the mirror plane.

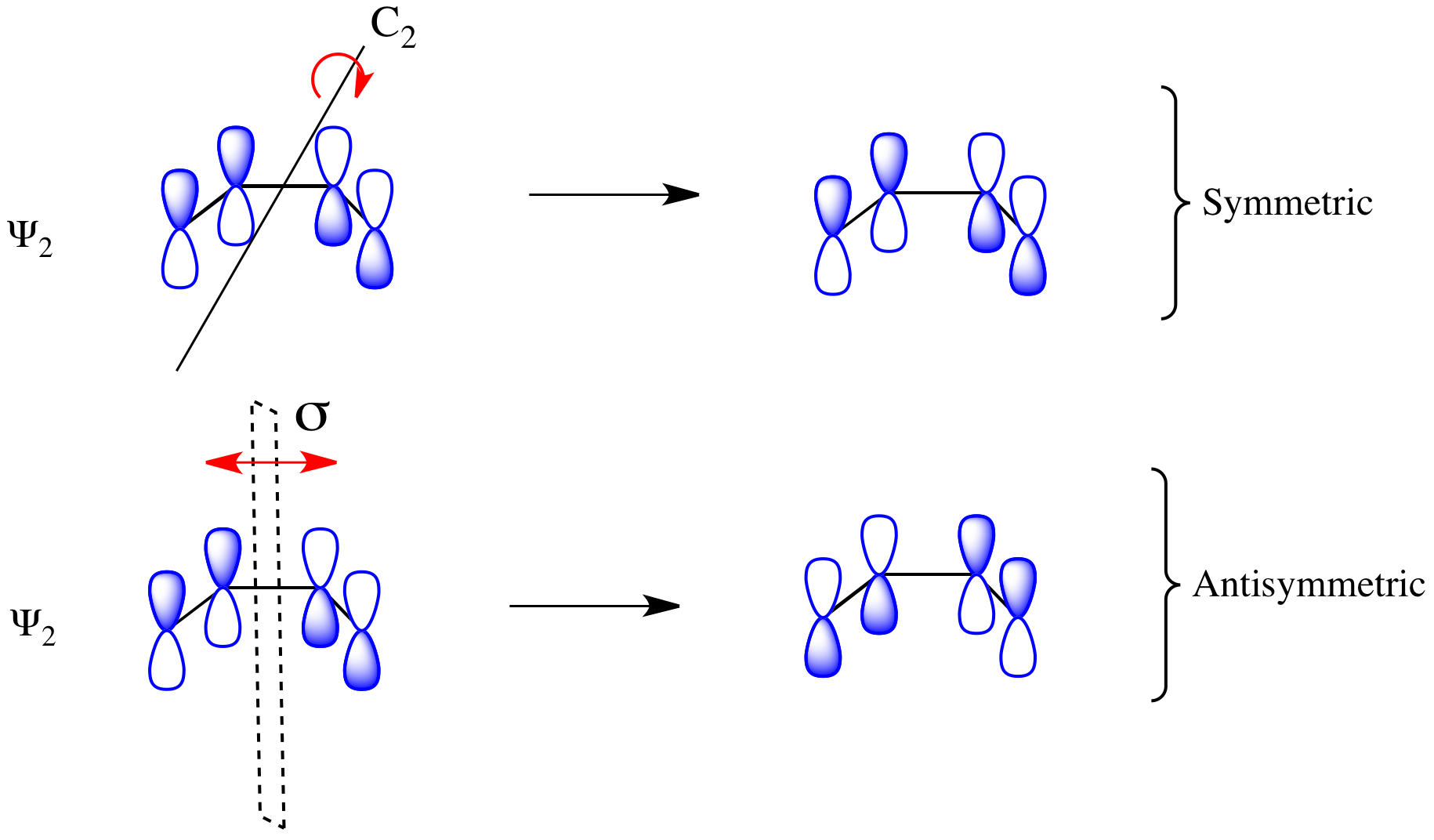

Ψ_{1} and Ψ_{3} are symmetric with respect to the mirror plane as the sign of the p-orbital lobes is preserved under the symmetry transformation. Similarly, Ψ_{1} and Ψ_{3} are antisymmetric with respect to the C_{2} axis as the rotation inverts the sign of the p-orbital lobes uniformly. Conversely Ψ_{2} and Ψ_{4} are symmetric with respect to the C_{2} axis and antisymmetric with respect to the σ mirror plane.

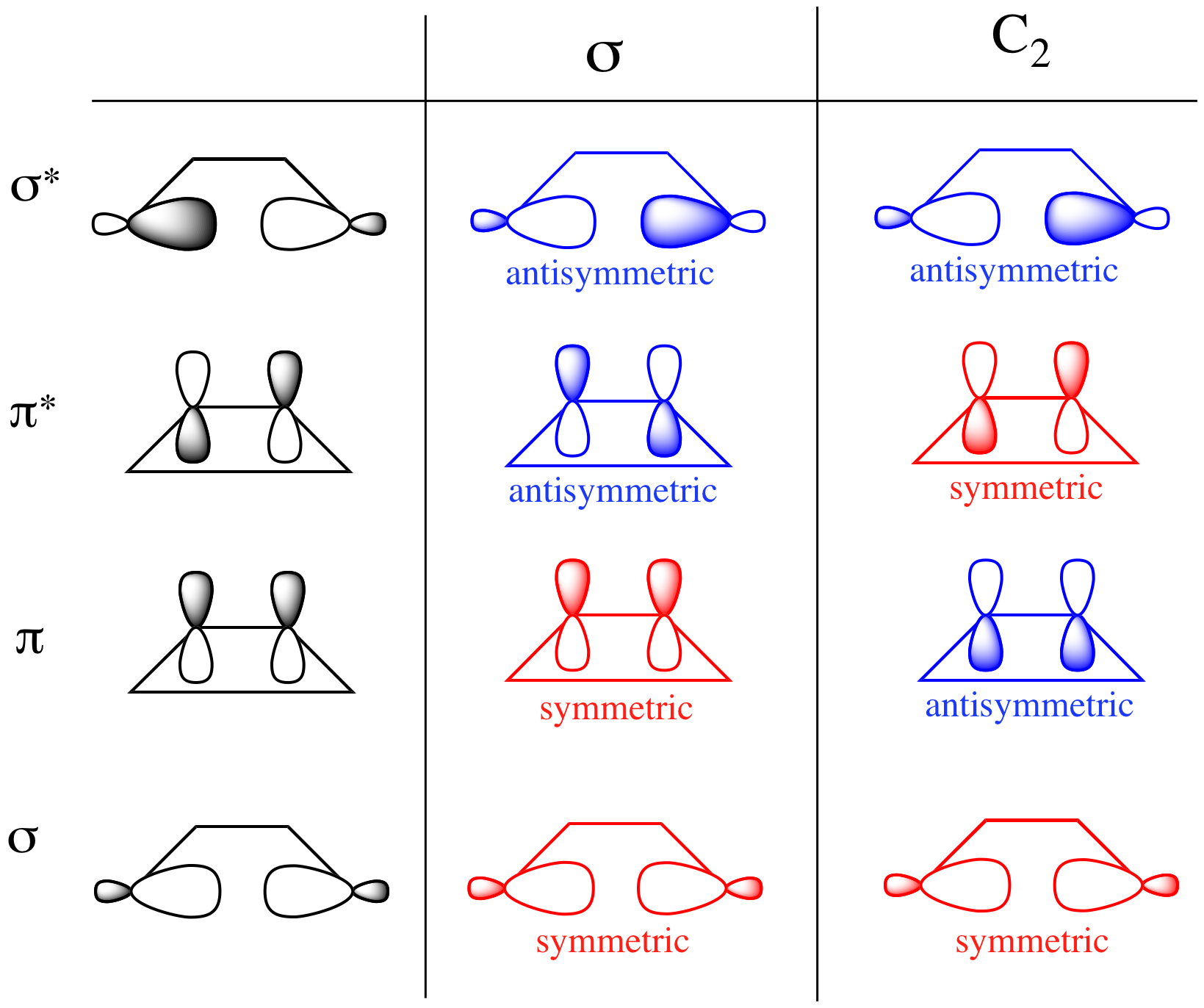

The same analysis can be carried out for the molecular orbitals of cyclobutene. The result of both symmetry operations on each of the MOs is shown to the left. As the σ and σ^{*} orbitals lie entirely in the plane containing C_{2} perpendicular to σ, they are uniformly symmetric and antisymmetric (respectively) to both symmetry elements. On the other hand, π is symmetric with respect to reflection and antisymmetric with respect to rotation, while π^{*} is antisymmetric with respect to reflection and symmetric with respect to rotation.

Correlation lines are drawn to connect molecular orbitals in the starting material and the product that have the same symmetry with respect to the conserved symmetry element. In the case of the conrotatory 4 electron electrocyclic ring closure of 1,3-butadiene, the lowest molecular orbital Ψ_{1} is asymmetric (A) with respect to the C_{2} axis. So this molecular orbital is correlated with the π orbital of cyclobutene, the lowest energy orbital that is also (A) with respect to the C_{2} axis. Similarly, Ψ_{2}, which is symmetric (S) with respect to the C_{2} axis, is correlated with σ of cyclobutene. The final two correlations are between the antisymmetric (A) molecular orbitals Ψ_{3} and σ^{*}, and the symmetric (S) molecular orbitals Ψ_{4} and π^{*}.

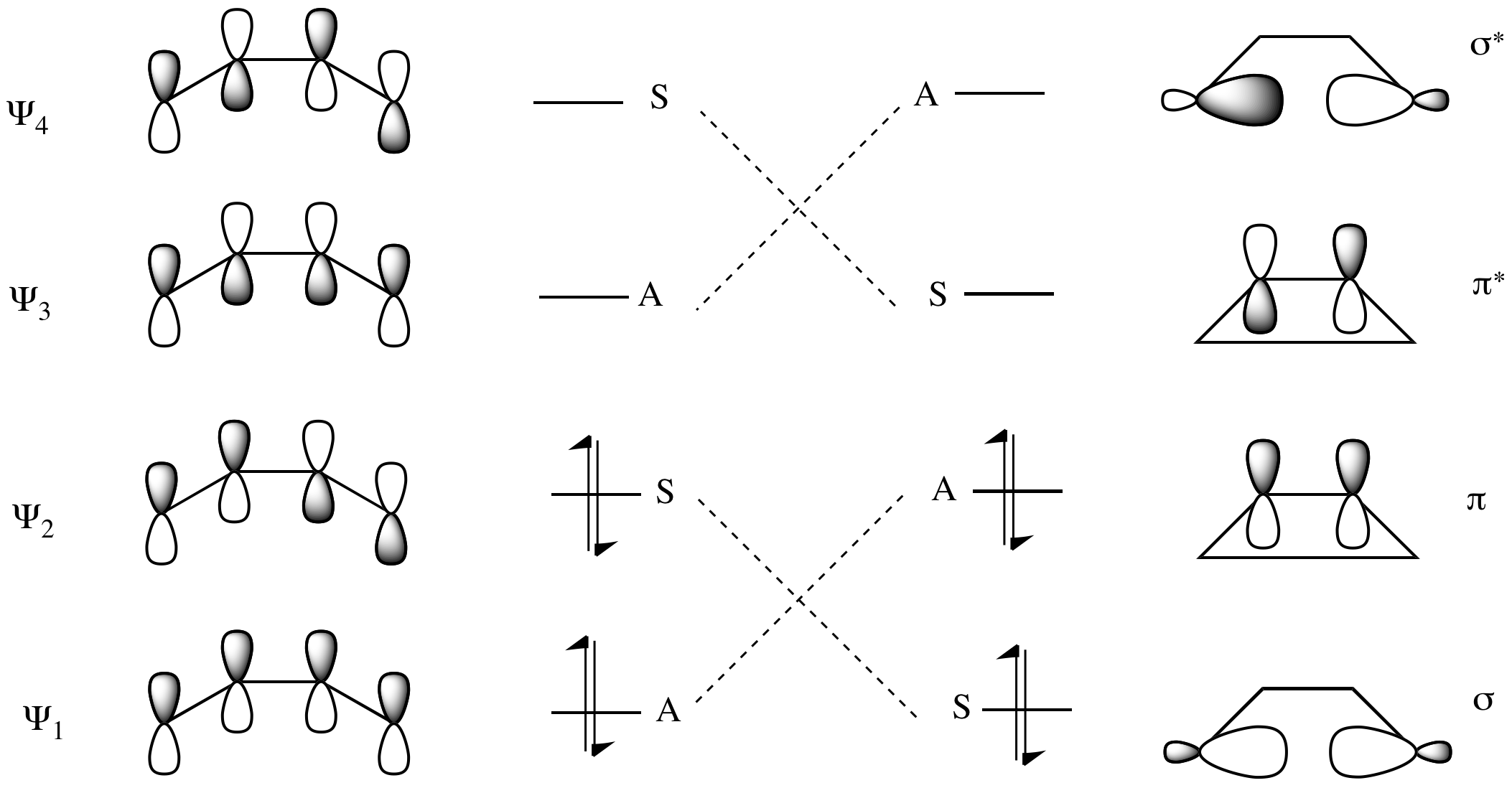
4 electron electrocyclization reaction correlation diagram with a conrotatory mechanism.

Similarly, there exists a correlation diagram for a disrotatory mechanism. In this mechanism, the symmetry element that persists throughout the entire mechanism is the σ mirror plane of reflection. Here the lowest energy MO Ψ_{1} of 1,3-butadiene is symmetric with respect to the reflection plane, and as such correlates with the symmetric σ MO of cyclobutene. Similarly the higher energy pair of symmetric molecular orbitals Ψ_{3} and π correlate. As for the asymmetric molecular orbitals, the lower energy pair Ψ_{2} and π^{*} form a correlation pair, as do Ψ_{4} and σ^{*}.

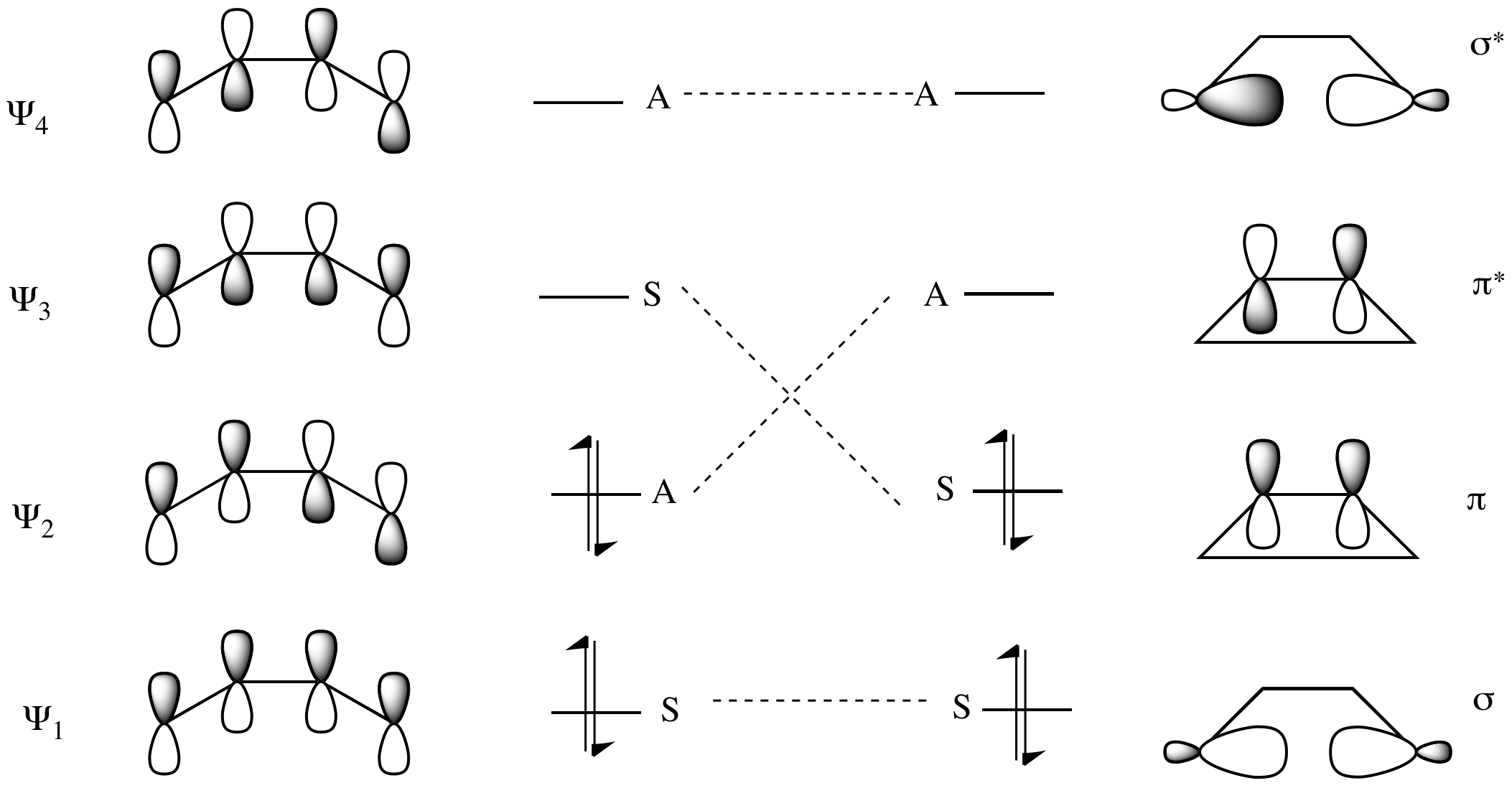
4 electron electrocyclization reaction correlation diagram with a disrotatory mechanism.

Evaluating the two mechanisms, the conrotatory mechanism is predicted to have a lower barrier because it transforms the electrons from ground-state orbitals of the reactants (Ψ_{1} and Ψ_{2}) into ground-state orbitals of the product (σ and π). Conversely, the disrotatory mechanism forces the conversion of the Ψ_{1} orbital into the σ orbital, and the Ψ_{2} orbital into the π^{*} orbital. Thus the two electrons in the ground-state Ψ_{2} orbital are transferred to an excited antibonding orbital, creating a doubly excited electronic state of the cyclobutene. This would lead to a significantly higher transition state barrier to reaction.

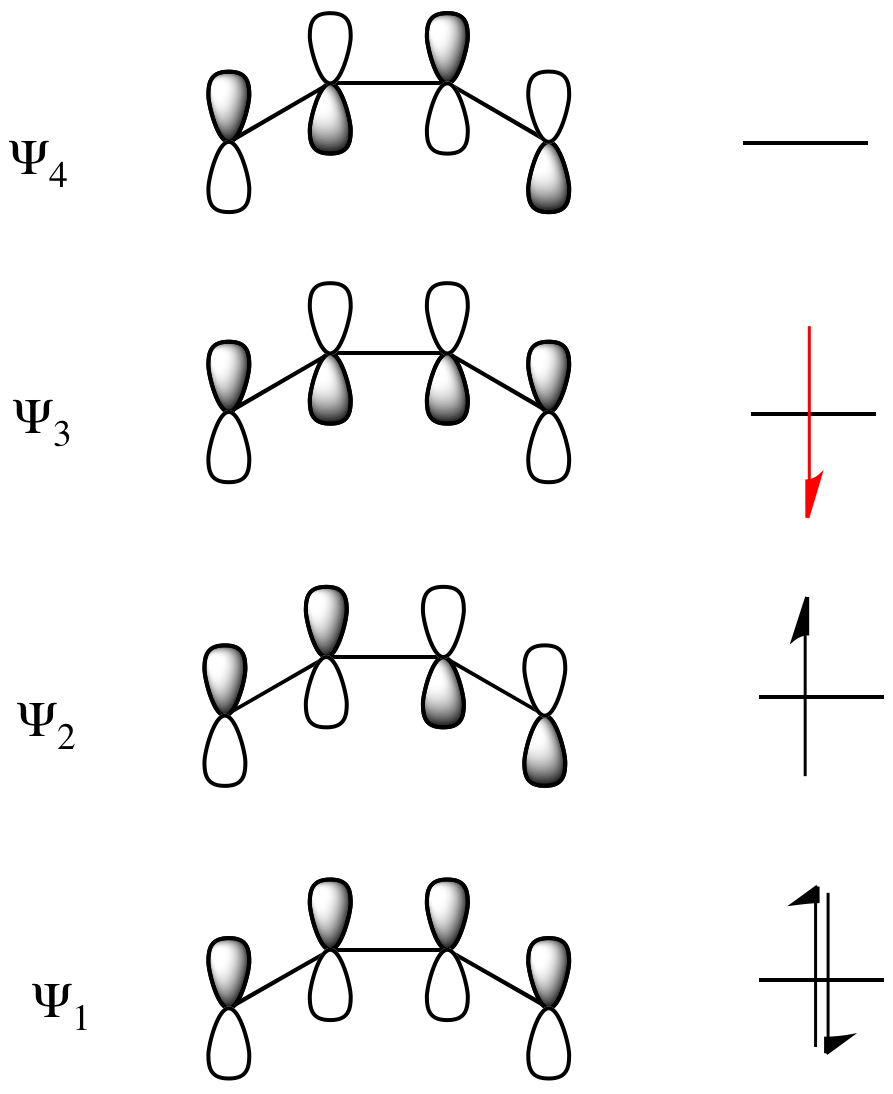
First excited state (ES-1) of butadiene.

However, as reactions do not take place between disjointed molecular orbitals, but electronic states, the final analysis involves state correlation diagrams. A state correlation diagram correlates the overall symmetry of electronic states in the starting material and product. The ground state of 1,3-butadiene, as shown above, has 2 electrons in Ψ_{1} and 2 electrons in Ψ_{2}, so it is represented as Ψ_{1}^{2}Ψ_{2}^{2}. The overall symmetry of the state is the product of the symmetries of each filled orbital with multiplicity for doubly populated orbitals. Thus, as Ψ_{1} is asymmetric with respect to the C_{2} axis, and Ψ_{2} is symmetric, the total state is represented by A^{2}S^{2}. To see why this particular product is mathematically overall S, that S can be represented as (+1) and A as (−1). This derives from the fact that signs of the lobes of the p-orbitals are multiplied by (+1) if they are symmetric with respect to a symmetry transformation (i.e. unaltered) and multiplied by (−1) if they are antisymmetric with respect to a symmetry transformation (i.e. inverted). Thus A^{2}S^{2}=(−1)^{2}(+1)^{2}=+1=S. The first excited state (ES-1) is formed from promoting an electron from the HOMO to the LUMO, and thus is represented as Ψ_{1}^{2}Ψ_{2}Ψ_{3}. As Ψ_{1}is A, Ψ_{2} is S, and Ψ_{3} is A, the symmetry of this state is given by A^{2}SA=A.Now considering the electronic states of the product, cyclobutene, the ground-state is given by σ^{2}π^{2}, which has symmetry S^{2}A^{2}=S. The first excited state (ES-1') is again formed from a promotion of an electron from the HOMO to the LUMO, so in this case it is represented as σ^{2}ππ^{*}. The symmetry of this state is S^{2}AS=A.

The ground state Ψ_{1}^{2}Ψ_{2}^{2} of 1,3-butadiene correlates with the ground state σ^{2}π^{2} of cyclobutene as demonstrated in the MO correlation diagram above. Ψ_{1} correlates with π and Ψ_{2} correlates with σ. Thus the orbitals making up Ψ_{1}^{2}Ψ_{2}^{2} must transform into the orbitals making up σ^{2}π^{2} under a conrotatory mechanism. However, the state ES-1 does not correlate with the state ES-1' as the molecular orbitals do not transform into each other under the symmetry-requirement seen in the molecular orbital correlation diagram. Instead as Ψ_{1} correlates with π, Ψ_{2} correlates with σ, and Ψ_{3} correlates with σ^{*}, the state Ψ_{1}^{2}Ψ_{2}Ψ_{3} attempts to transform into π^{2}σσ^{*}, which is a different excited state. So ES-1 attempts to correlate with ES-2'=σπ^{2}σ^{*}, which is higher in energy than Es-1'. Similarly ES-1'=σ^{2}ππ^{*} attempts to correlate with ES-2=Ψ_{1}Ψ_{2}^{2}Ψ_{4}. These correlations can not actually take place due to the quantum-mechanical rule known as the avoided crossing rule. This says that energetic configurations of the same symmetry can not cross on an energy level correlation diagram. In short, this is caused by mixing of states of the same symmetry when brought close enough in energy. So instead a high energetic barrier is formed between a forced transformation of ES-1 into ES-1'. In the diagram below the symmetry-preferred correlations are shown in dashed lines and the bold curved lines indicate the actual correlation with the high energetic barrier.

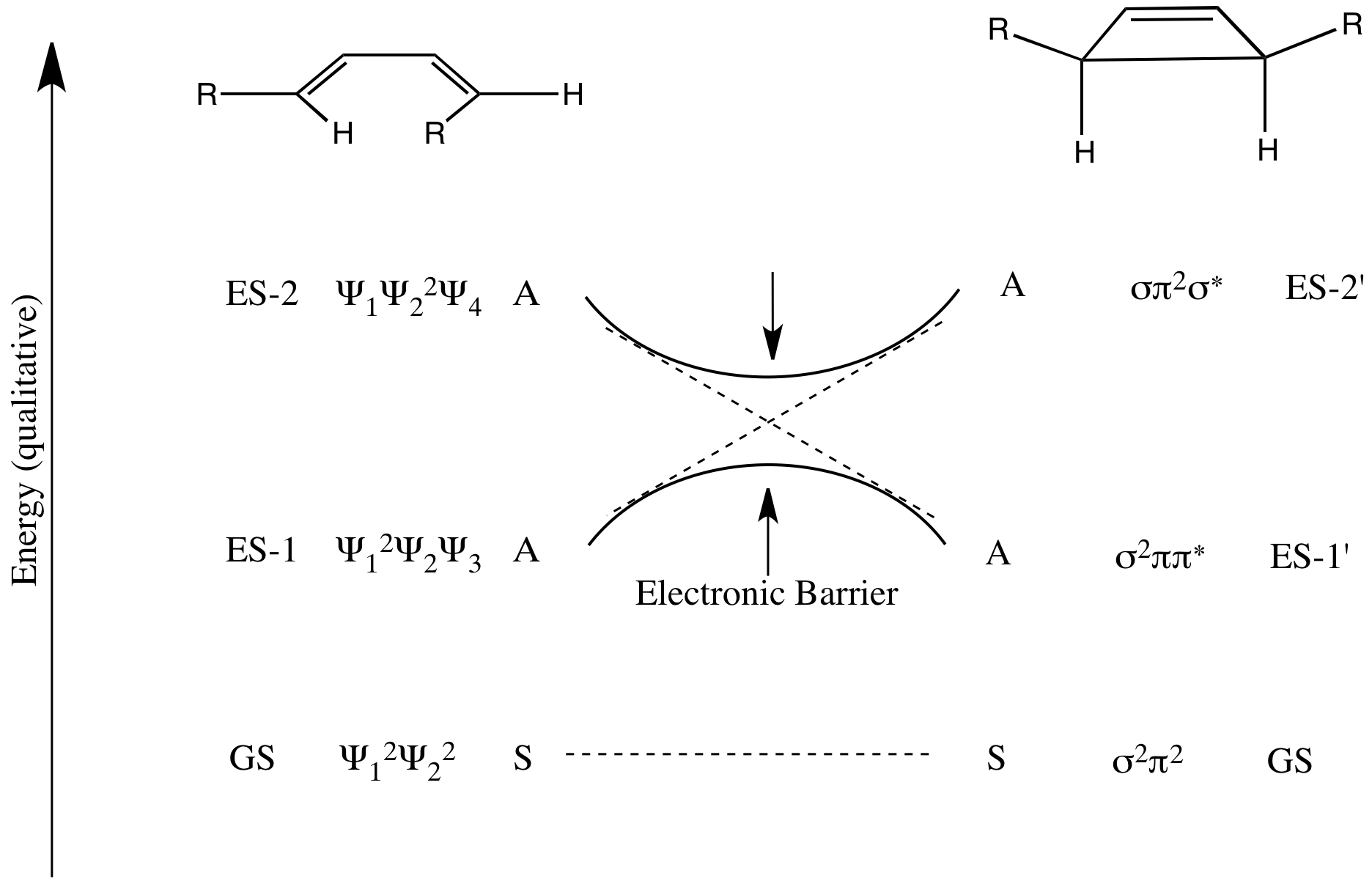
4 electron electrocyclization state correlation diagram with a conrotatory mechanism.

The same analysis can be applied to the disrotatory mechanism to create the following state correlation diagram.

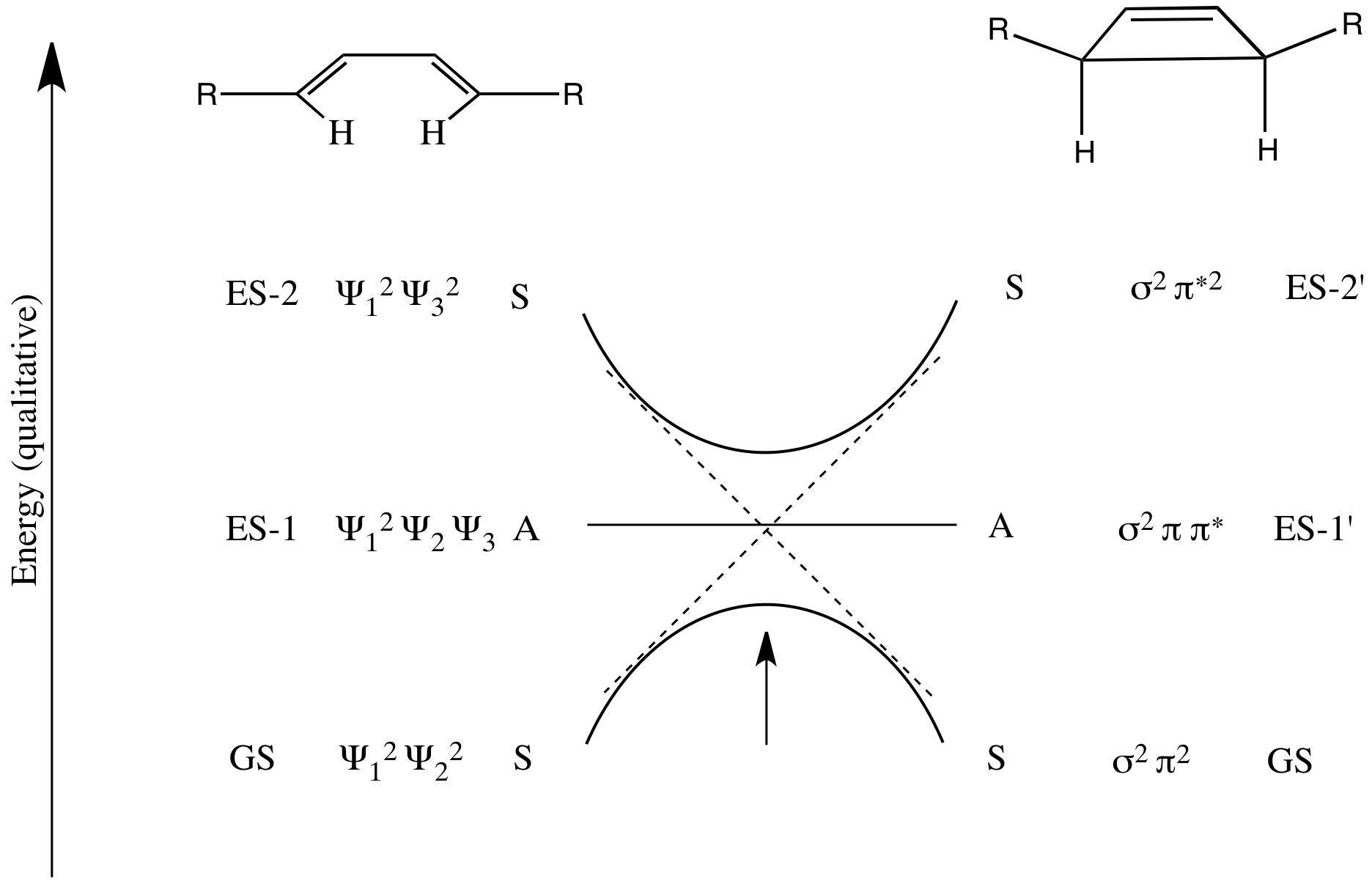
4 electron electrocyclization state correlation diagram under disrotatory mechanism.

Thus if the molecule is in the ground state it will proceed through the conrotatory mechanism (i.e. under thermal control) to avoid an electronic barrier. However, if the molecule is in the first excited state (i.e. under photochemical control), the electronic barrier is present in the conrotatory mechanism and the reaction will proceed through the disrotatory mechanism. These are not completely distinct as both the conrotatory and disrotatory mechanisms lie on the same potential surface. Thus a more correct statement is that as a ground state molecule explores the potential energy surface, it is more likely to achieve the activation barrier to undergo a conrotatory mechanism.

=== Cycloaddition reactions ===
The Woodward–Hoffmann rules can also explain bimolecular cycloaddition reactions through correlation diagrams. A [_{π}p + _{π}q] cycloaddition brings together two components, one with p π-electrons, and the other with q π-electrons. Cycloaddition reactions are further characterized as suprafacial (s) or antarafacial (a) with respect to each of the π components. (See below "General formulation" for a detailed description of the generalization of WH notation to all pericyclic processes.)

==== [2+2] Cycloadditions ====
For ordinary alkenes, [2+2] cycloadditions are only observed under photochemical activation.

The rationale for the non-observation of thermal [2+2] cycloadditions begins with the analysis of the four possible stereochemical consequences for the [2+2] cycloaddition: [_{π}2_{s} + _{π}2_{s}], [_{π}2_{a} + _{π}2_{s}], [_{π}2_{s} + _{π}2_{a}], [_{π}2_{a} + _{π}2_{a}]. The geometrically most plausible [_{π}2_{s} + _{π}2_{s}] mode is forbidden under thermal conditions, while the [_{π}2_{a} + _{π}2_{s}], [_{π}2_{s} + _{π}2_{a}] approaches are allowed from the point of view of symmetry but are rare due to an unfavorable strain and steric profile.

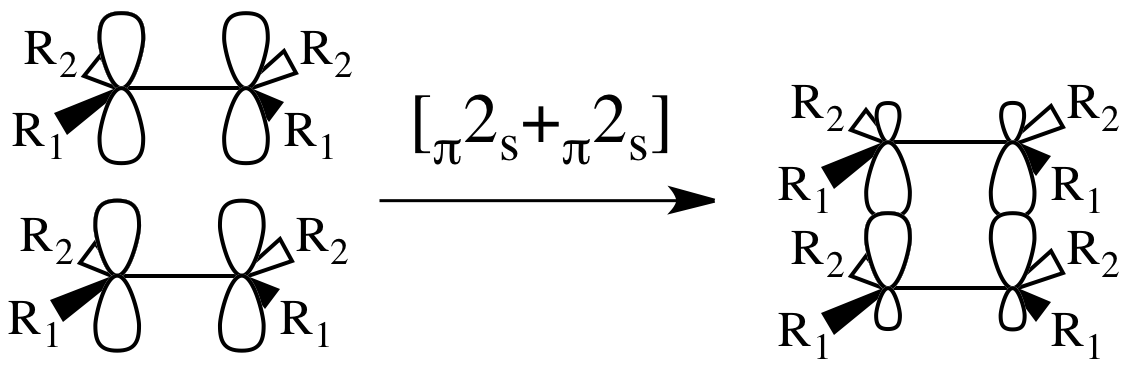
The [2_{s} + 2_{s}] cycloaddition retains stereochemistry.

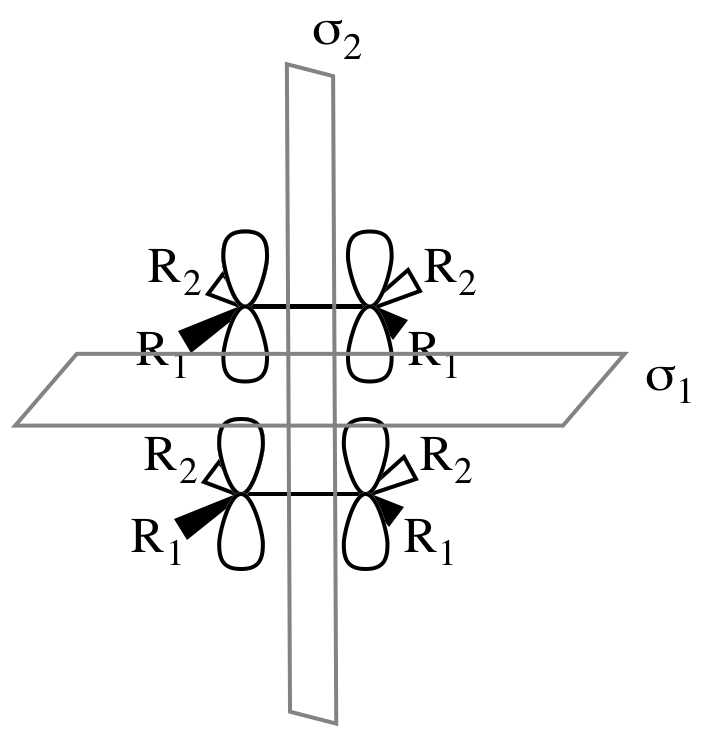
Symmetry elements of the [2+2] cycloaddition.

Considering the [_{π}2_{s} + _{π}2_{s}] cycloaddition. This mechanism leads to a retention of stereochemistry in the product, as illustrated to the right. Two symmetry elements are present in the starting materials, transition state, and product: σ_{1} and σ_{2}. σ_{1} is the mirror plane between the components perpendicular to the p-orbitals; σ_{2} splits the molecules in half perpendicular to the σ-bonds. These are both local-symmetry elements in the case that the components are not identical.

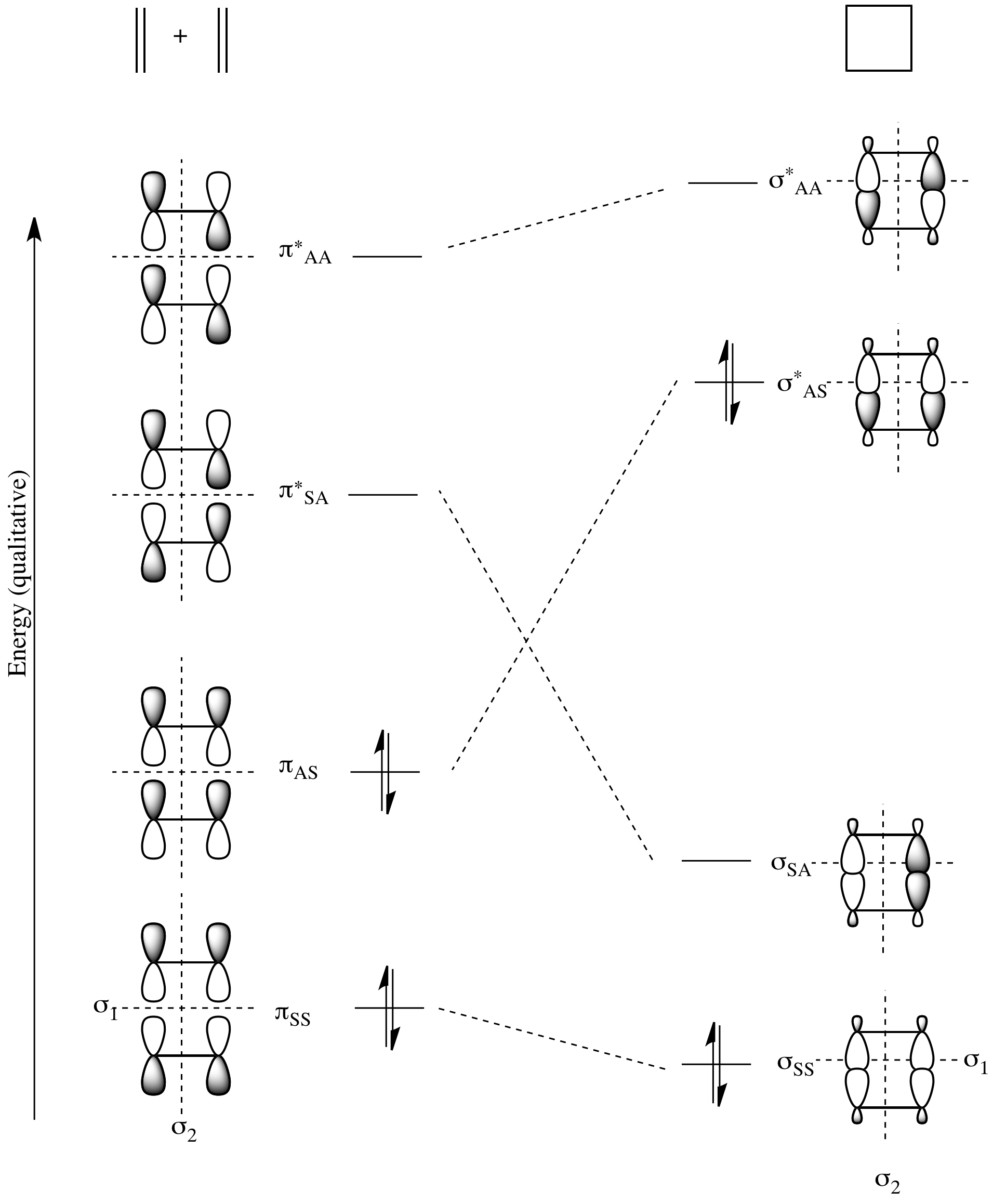

To determine symmetry and asymmetry with respect to σ_{1} and σ_{2}, the starting material molecular orbitals must be considered in tandem. The figure to the right shows the molecular orbital correlation diagram for the [_{π}2_{s} + _{π}2_{s}] cycloaddition. The two π and π^{*} molecular orbitals of the starting materials are characterized by their symmetry with respect to first σ_{1} and then σ_{2}. Similarly, the σ and σ^{*} molecular orbitals of the product are characterized by their symmetry. In the correlation diagram, molecular orbitals transformations over the course of the reaction must conserve the symmetry of the molecular orbitals. Thus π_{SS} correlates with σ_{SS}, π_{AS} correlates with σ^{*}_{AS}, π^{*}_{SA} correlates with σ_{SA}, and finally π^{*}_{AA} correlates with σ^{*}_{AA}. Due to conservation of orbital symmetry, the bonding orbital π_{AS} is forced to correlate with the antibonding orbital σ^{*}_{AS}. Thus a high barrier is predicted.

This is made precise in the state correlation diagram below. The ground state in the starting materials is the electronic state where π_{SS} and π_{AS} are both doubly populated – i.e. the state (SS)^{2}(AS)^{2}. As such, this state attempts to correlate with the electronic state in the product where both σ_{SS} and σ^{*}_{AS} are doubly populated – i.e. the state (SS)^{2}(AS)^{2}. However, this state is neither the ground state (SS)^{2}(SA)^{2} of cyclobutane, nor the first excited state ES-1'=(SS)^{2}(SA)(AS), where an electron is promoted from the HOMO to the LUMO.

==== [4+2] cycloadditions ====
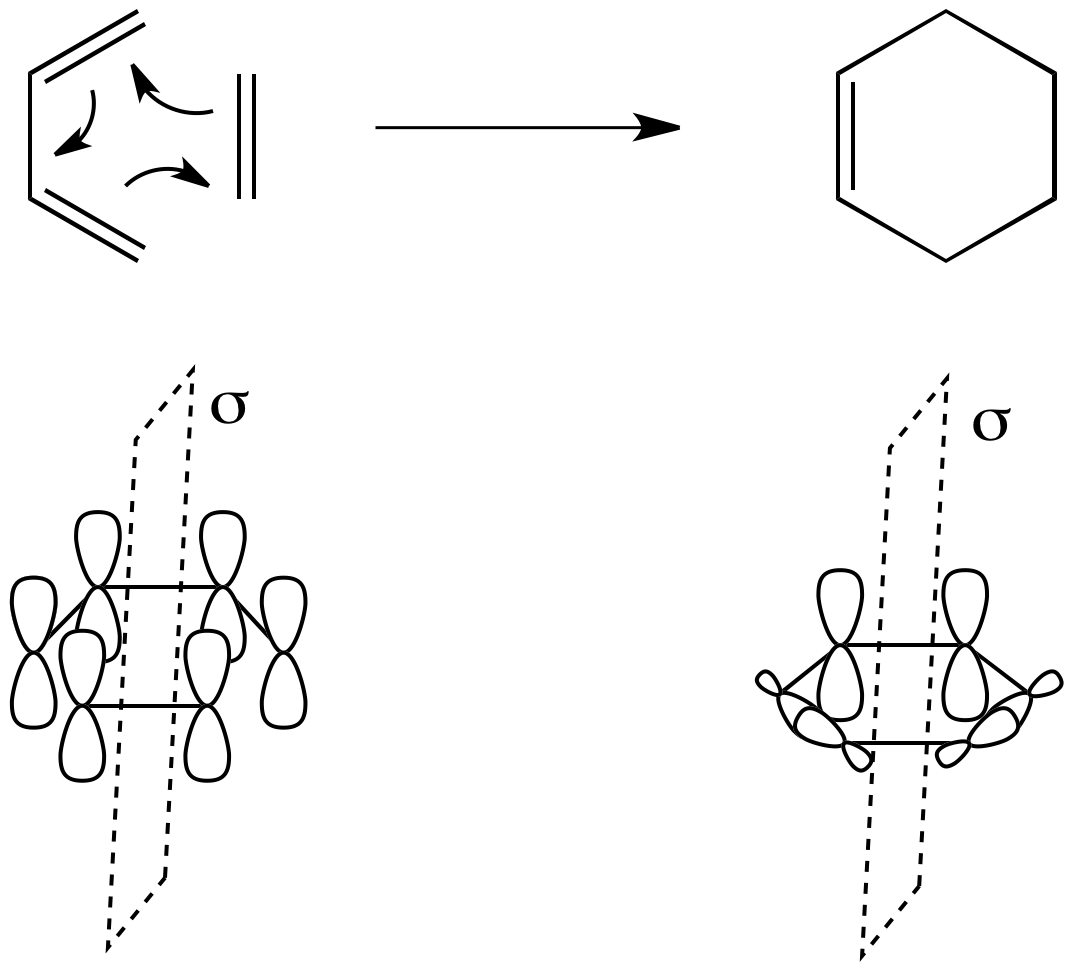
The mirror plane is the only conserved symmetry element of the Diels-Alder [4+2]-cycloaddition.

A [4+2] cycloaddition is exemplified by the Diels-Alder reaction. The simplest case is the reaction of 1,3-butadiene with ethylene to form cyclohexene.

One symmetry element is conserved in this transformation – the mirror plane through the center of the reactants as shown to the left. The molecular orbitals of the reactants are the set {Ψ_{1}, Ψ_{2}, Ψ_{3}, Ψ_{4}} of molecular orbitals of 1,3-butadiene shown above, along with π and π^{*} of ethylene. Ψ_{1} is symmetric, Ψ_{2} is antisymmetric, Ψ_{3} is symmetric, and Ψ_{4} is antisymmetric with respect to the mirror plane. Similarly π is symmetric and π^{*} is antisymmetric with respect to the mirror plane.

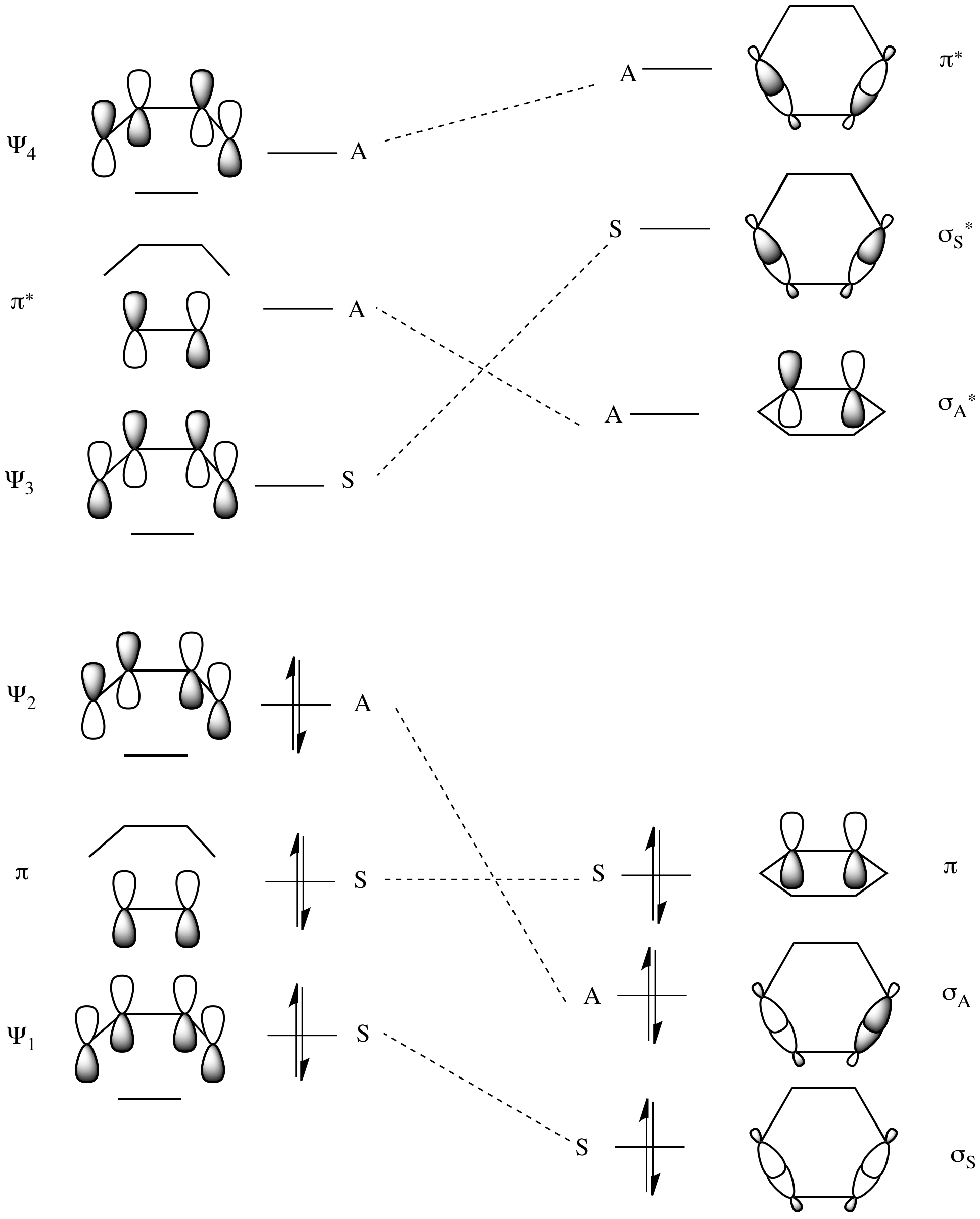

The molecular orbitals of the product are the symmetric and antisymmetric combinations of the two newly formed σ and σ^{*} bonds and the π and π^{*} bonds as shown below.

Correlating the pairs of orbitals in the starting materials and product of the same symmetry and increasing energy gives the correlation diagram to the right. As this transforms the ground state bonding molecular orbitals of the starting materials into the ground state bonding orbitals of the product in a symmetry conservative manner this is predicted to not have the great energetic barrier present in the ground state [2+2] reaction above.

To make the analysis precise, one can construct the state correlation diagram for the general [4+2]-cycloaddition. As before, the ground state is the electronic state depicted in the molecular orbital correlation diagram to the right. This can be described as Ψ_{1}^{2}π^{2}Ψ_{2}^{2}, of total symmetry S^{2}S^{2} A^{2}=S. This correlates with the ground state of the cyclohexene σ_{S}σ_{A}π^{2} which is also S^{2}S^{2}A^{2}=S. As such this ground state reaction is not predicted to have a high symmetry-imposed barrier.

One can also construct the excited-state correlations as is done above. Here, there is a high energetic barrier to a photo-induced Diels-Alder reaction under a suprafacial-suprafacial bond topology due to the avoided crossing shown below.

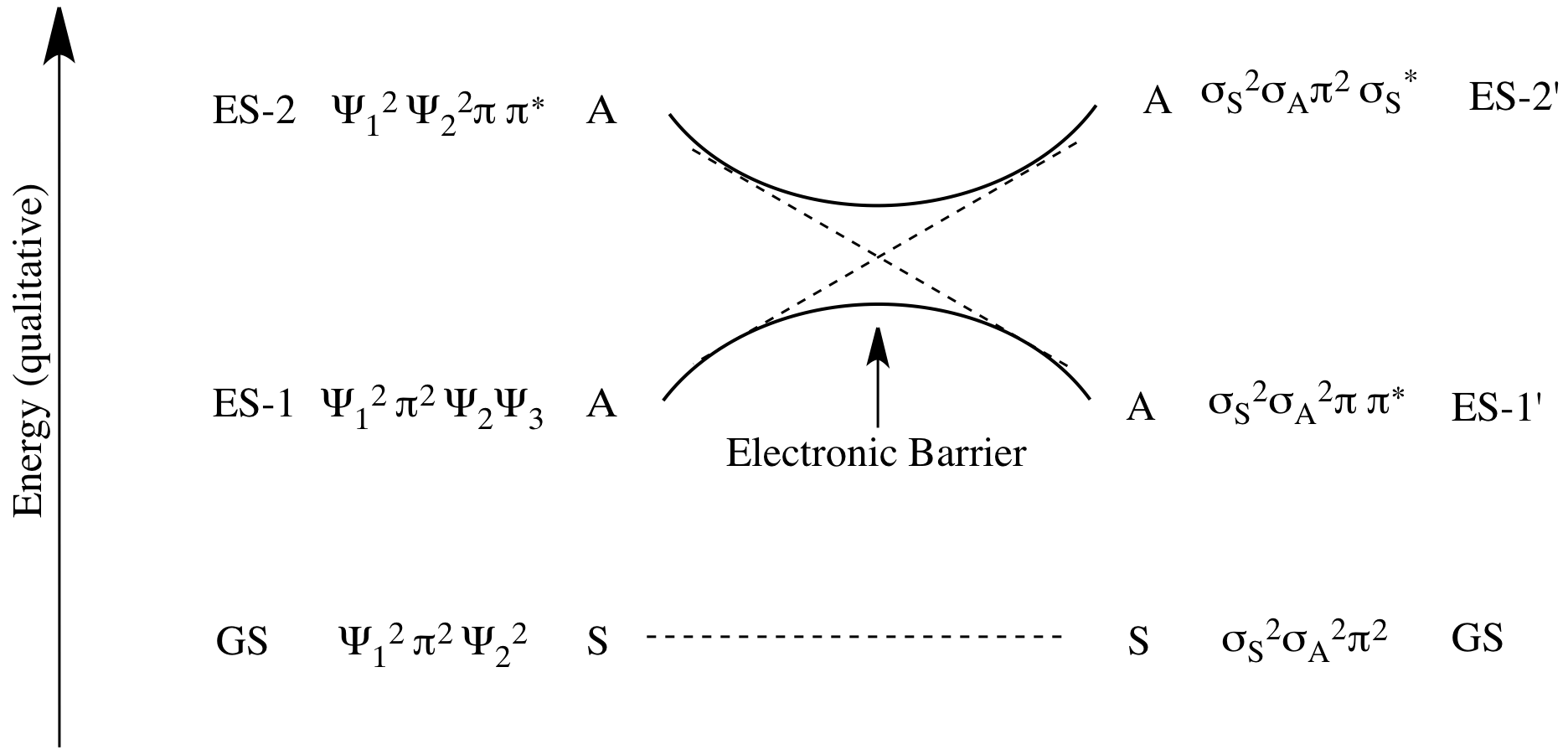

=== Group transfer reactions ===
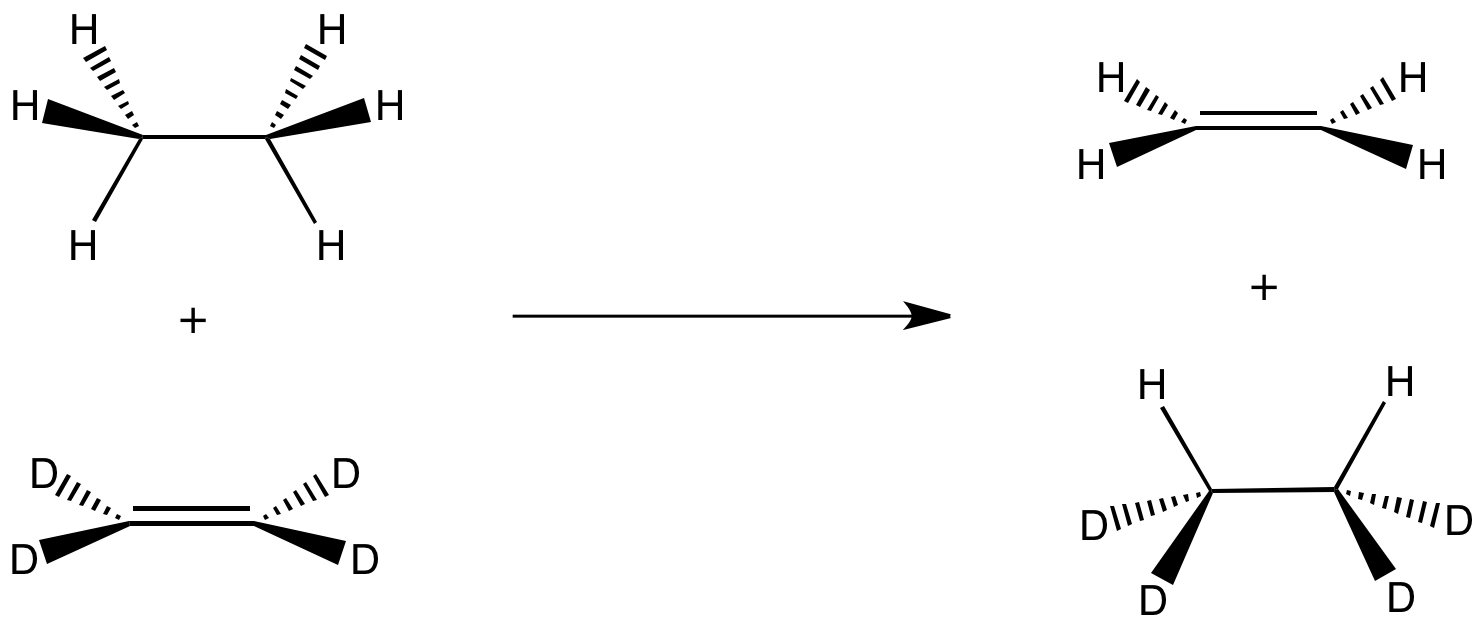
Transfer of a pair of hydrogen atoms from ethane to perdeuterioethylene.

The symmetry-imposed barrier heights of group transfer reactions can also be analyzed using correlation diagrams. A model reaction is the transfer of a pair of hydrogen atoms from ethane to perdeuterioethylene shown to the right.

The only conserved symmetry element in this reaction is the mirror plane through the center of the molecules as shown to the left.

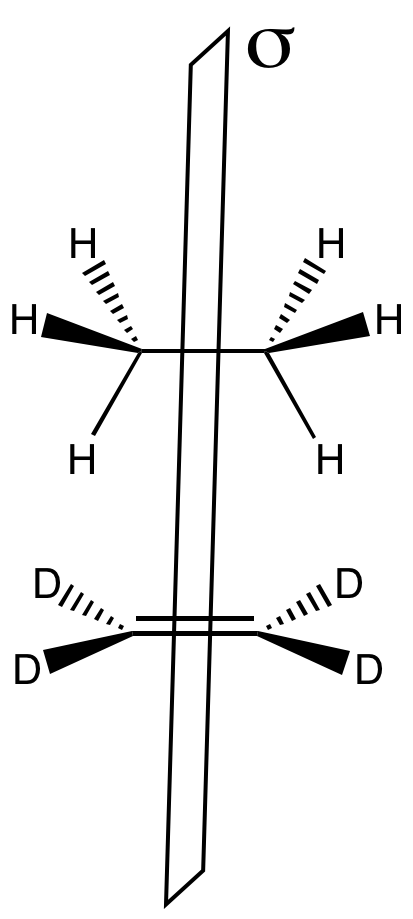
Conserved mirror plane in transfer reaction.

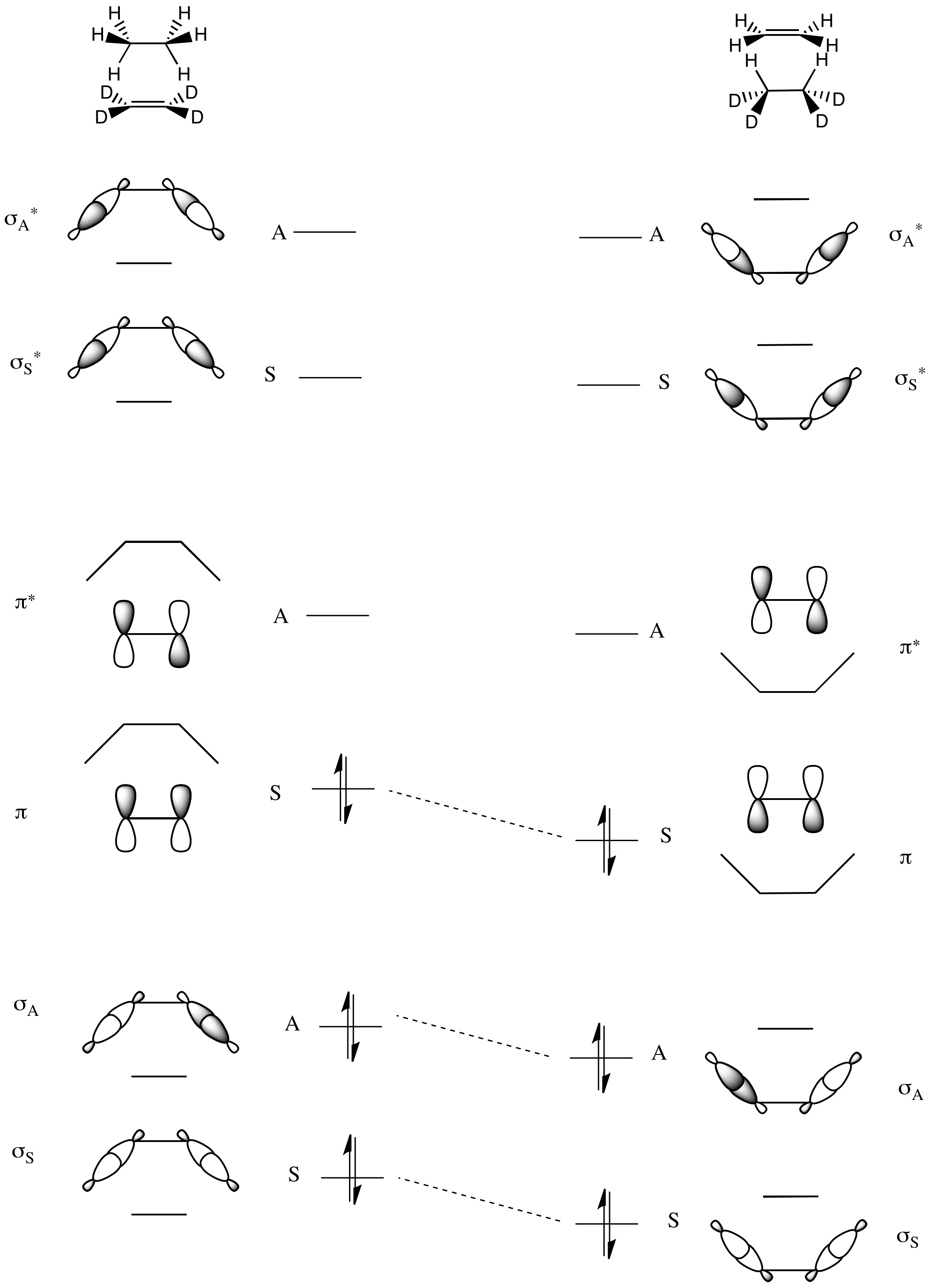

The molecular orbitals of the system are constructed as symmetric and antisymmetric combinations of σ and σ^{*} C–H bonds in ethane and π and π^{*} bonds in the deutero-substituted ethene. Thus the lowest energy MO is the symmetric sum of the two C–H σ-bond (σ_{S}), followed by the antisymmetric sum (σ_{A}). The two highest energy MOs are formed from linear combinations of the σ_{CH} antibonds – highest is the antisymmetric σ^{*}_{A}, preceded by the symmetric σ^{*}_{A} at a slightly lower energy. In the middle of the energetic scale are the two remaining MOs that are the π_{CC} and π^{*}_{CC} of ethene.

The full molecular orbital correlation diagram is constructed in by matching pairs of symmetric and asymmetric MOs of increasing total energy, as explained above. As can be seen in the adjacent diagram, as the bonding orbitals of the reactants exactly correlate with the bonding orbitals of the products, this reaction is not predicted to have a high electronic symmetry-imposed barrier.

== Selection rules ==
Using correlation diagrams one can derive selection rules for the following generalized classes of pericyclic reactions. Each of these particular classes is further generalized in the generalized Woodward–Hoffmann rules. The more inclusive bond topology descriptors antarafacial and suprafacial subsume the terms conrotatory and disrotatory, respectively. Antarafacial refers to bond making or breaking through the opposite face of a π system, p orbital, or σ bond, while suprafacial refers to the process occurring through the same face. A suprafacial transformation at a chiral center preserves stereochemistry, whereas an antarafacial transformation reverses stereochemistry.

=== Electrocyclic reactions ===
The selection rule of electrocyclization reactions is given in the original statement of the Woodward–Hoffmann rules. If a generalized electrocyclic ring closure occurs in a polyene of 4n π-electrons, then it is conrotatory under thermal conditions and disrotatory under photochemical conditions. Conversely in a polyene of 4n + 2 π-electrons, an electrocyclic ring closure is disrotatory under thermal conditions and conrotatory under photochemical conditions.

This result can either be derived via an FMO analysis based upon the sign of p orbital lobes of the HOMO of the polyene or with correlation diagrams. Taking first the first possibility, in the ground state, if a polyene has 4n electrons, the outer p-orbitals of the HOMO that form the σ bond in the electrocyclized product are of opposite signs. Thus a constructive overlap is only produced under a conrotatory or antarafacial process. Conversely for a polyene with 4n + 2 electrons, the outer p-orbitals of the ground state HOMO are of the same sign. Thus constructive orbital overlap occurs with a disrotatory or suprafacical process.

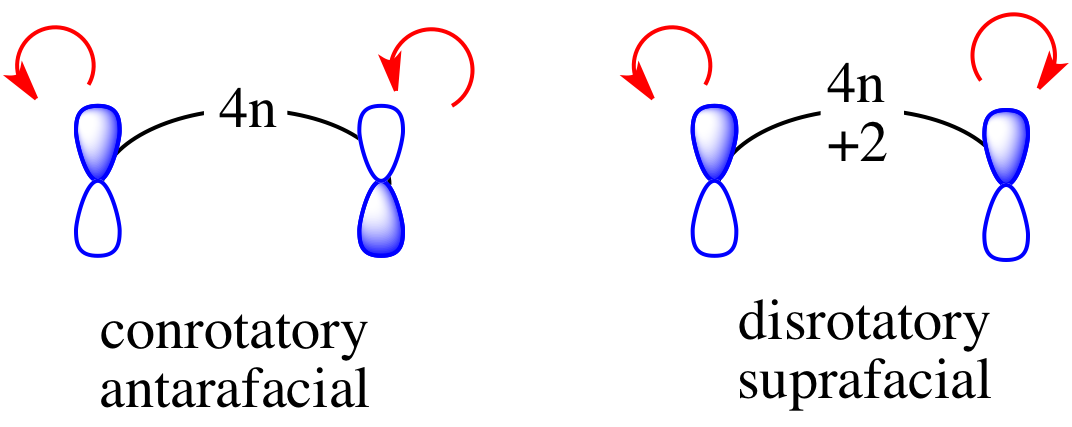
A 4n electron electrocyclic reaction achieves constructive HOMO orbital overlap if it is conrotatory, while a 4n+2 electrocyclic reaction achieves constructive overlap if it is disrotatory.

Additionally, the correlation diagram for any 4n electrocyclic reaction will resemble the diagram for the 4 electron cyclization of 1,3-butadiene, while the correlation diagram any 4n + 2 electron electrocyclic reaction will resemble the correlation diagram for the 6 electron cyclization of 1,3,5-hexatriene.

This is summarized in the following table:

	Thermally allowed	Photochemically allowed
4n	conrotatory	disrotatory
4n + 2	disrotatory	conrotatory

=== Sigmatropic rearrangement reactions ===
A general sigmatropic rearrangement can be classified as order [i,j], meaning that a σ bond originally between atoms denoted 1 and 1', adjacent to one or more π systems, is shifted to between atoms i and j. Thus it migrates (i − 1), (j − 1) atoms away from its original position.

A formal symmetry analysis via correlation diagrams is of no use in the study of sigmatropic rearrangements as there are, in general, only symmetry elements present in the transition state. Except in special cases (e.g. [3,3]-rearrangements), there are no symmetry elements that are conserved as the reaction coordinate is traversed. Nevertheless, orbital correlations between starting materials and products can still be analyzed, and correlations of starting material orbitals with high energy product orbitals will, as usual, result in "symmetry-forbidden" processes. However, an FMO based approach (or the Dewar-Zimmerman analysis) is more straightforward to apply.

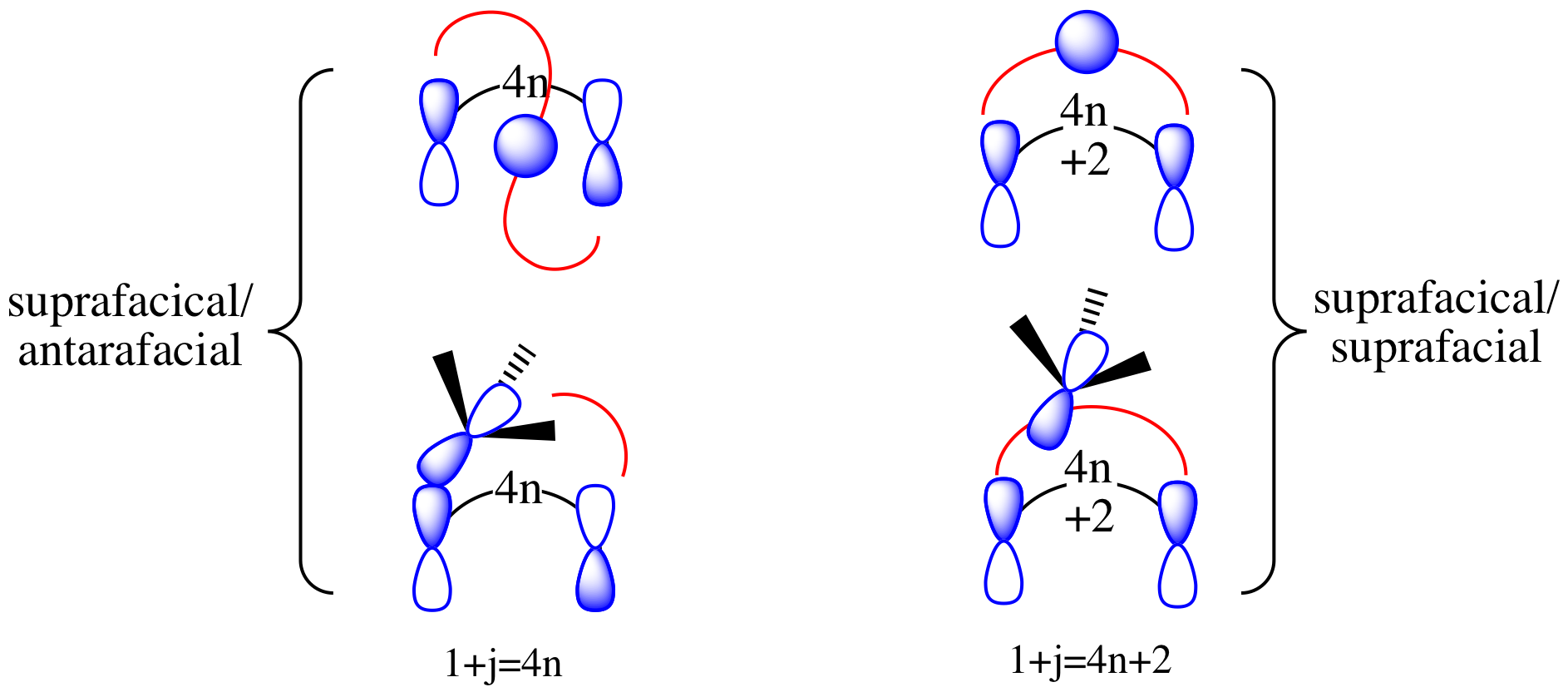
In [1,j]-sigmatropic rearrangements if 1+j = 4n, then supra/antara is thermally allowed, and if 1+j = 4n+2, then supra/supra or antara/antara is thermally allowed.

One of the most prevalent classes of sigmatropic shifts is classified as [1,j], where j is odd. That means one terminus of the σ-bond migrates (j − 1) bonds away across a π-system while the other terminus does not migrate. It is a reaction involving j + 1 electrons: j − 1 from the π-system and 2 from σ-bond. Using FMO analysis, [1,j]-sigmatropic rearrangements are allowed if the transition state has constructive overlap between the migrating group and the accepting p orbital of the HOMO. In [1,j]-sigmatropic rearrangements if j + 1 = 4n, then supra/antara is thermally allowed, and if j + 1 = 4n + 2, then supra/supra or antara/antara is thermally allowed.

The other prevalent class of sigmatropic rearrangements are [3,3], notably the Cope and Claisen rearrangements. Here, the constructive interactions must be between the HOMOs of the two allyl radical fragments in the transition state. The ground state HOMO Ψ_{2} of the allyl fragment is shown below. As the terminal p-orbitals are of opposite sign, this reaction can either take place in a supra/supra topology, or an antara/antara topology.

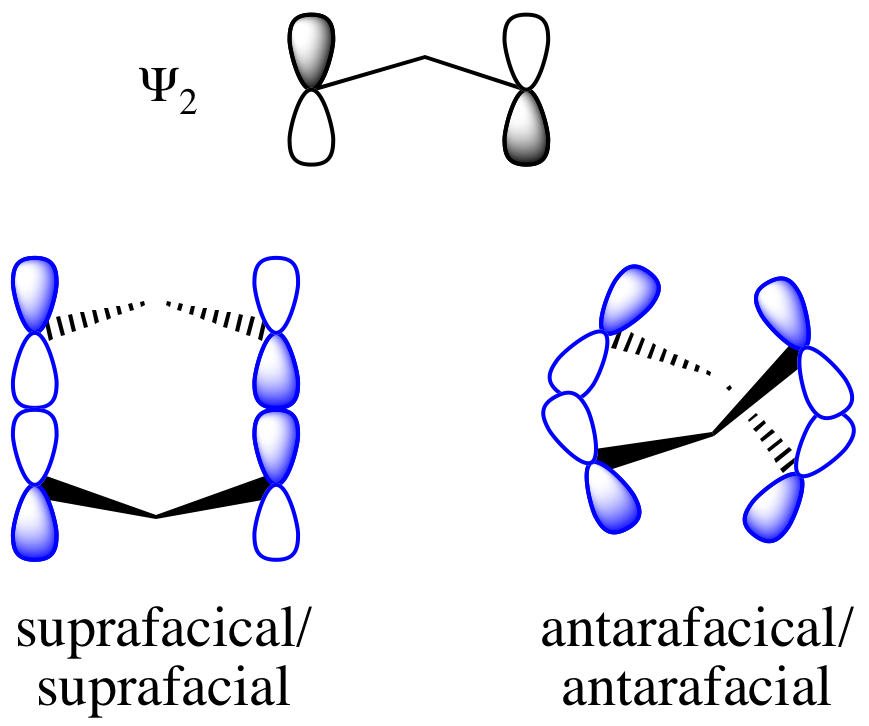
The [3,3]-sigmatropic ground state reaction is allowed via either a supra/supra or antara/antara topology.

The selection rules for an [i,j]-sigmatropic rearrangement are as follows:

- For supra/supra or antara/antara [i,j]-sigmatropic shifts, if i + j = 4n + 2 they are thermally allowed and if i + j = 4n they are photochemically allowed
- For supra/antara [i,j]-sigmatropic shifts, if i + j = 4n they are thermally allowed, and if i + j = 4n + 2 they are photochemically allowed

This is summarized in the following table:

i + j	Thermally allowed	Photochemically allowed
4n	i_{s} + j_{a} or i_{a} + j_{s}	i_{s} + j_{s} or i_{a} + j_{a}
4n + 2	i_{s} + j_{s} or i_{a} + j_{a}	i_{s} + j_{a} or i_{a} + j_{s}

=== Cycloaddition reactions ===
A general [p+q]-cycloaddition is a concerted addition reaction between two components, one with p π-electrons, and one with q π-electrons. This reaction is symmetry allowed under the following conditions:

- For a supra/supra or antara/antara cycloaddition, it is thermally allowed if p + q = 4n + 2 and photochemically allowed if p + q = 4n
- For a supra/antara cycloaddition, it is thermally allowed if p + q = 4n and photochemically allowed if p + q = 4n + 2

This is summarized in the following table:

p + q	Thermally allowed	Photochemically allowed
4n	p_{s} + q_{a} or p_{a} + q_{s}	p_{s} + q_{s} or p_{a} + q_{a}
4n + 2	p_{s} + q_{s} or p_{a} + q_{a}	p_{s} + q_{a} or p_{a} + q_{s}

=== Group transfer reactions ===
A general double group transfer reaction which is synchronous can be represented as an interaction between a component with p π electrons and a component with q π electrons as shown.

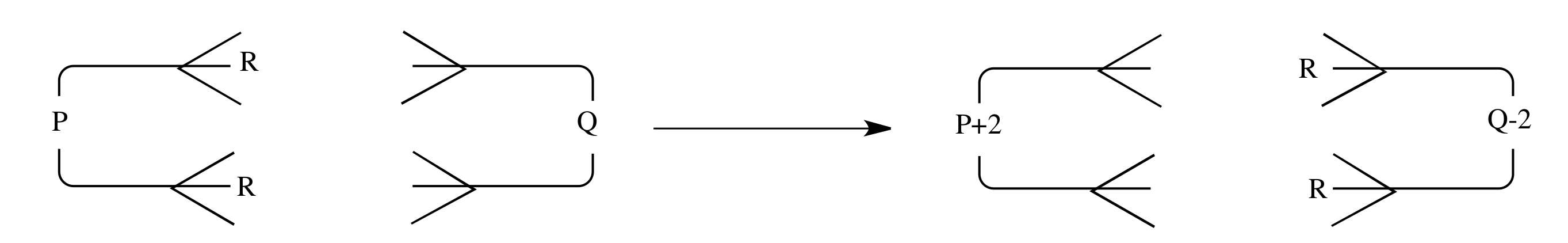
Generalized synchronous double group transfer reaction between a component with p π electrons and a component with q π electrons.

Then the selection rules are the same as for the generalized cycloaddition reactions. That is

- For supra/supra or antara/antara double group transfers, if p + q = 4n + 2 it is thermally allowed, and if p + q = 4n it is photochemically allowed
- For supra/antara double group transfers, if p + q = 4n it is thermally allowed, and if p + q = 4n + 2 it is photochemically allowed

This is summarized in the following table:

p + q	Thermally allowed	Photochemically allowed
4n	p_{s} + q_{a} or p_{a} + q_{s}	p_{s} + q_{s} or p_{a} + q_{a}
4n + 2	p_{s} + q_{s} or p_{a} + q_{a}	p_{s} + q_{a} or p_{a} + q_{s}

The case of q = 0 corresponds to the thermal elimination of the "transferred" R groups. There is evidence that the pyrolytic eliminations of dihydrogen and ethane from 1,4-cyclohexadiene and 3,3,6,6-tetramethyl-1,4-cyclohexadiene, respectively, represent examples of this type of pericyclic process.

The ene reaction is often classified as a type of group transfer process, even though it does not involve the transfer of two σ-bonded groups. Rather, only one σ-bond is transferred while a second σ-bond is formed from a broken π-bond. As an all suprafacial process involving 6 electrons, it is symmetry-allowed under thermal conditions. The Woodward-Hoffmann symbol for the ene reaction is [_{π}2_{s} + _{π}2_{s} + _{σ}2_{s}] (see below).

== General formulation ==
Though the Woodward–Hoffmann rules were first stated in terms of electrocyclic processes, they were eventually generalized to all pericyclic reactions, as the similarity and patterns in the above selection rules should indicate.

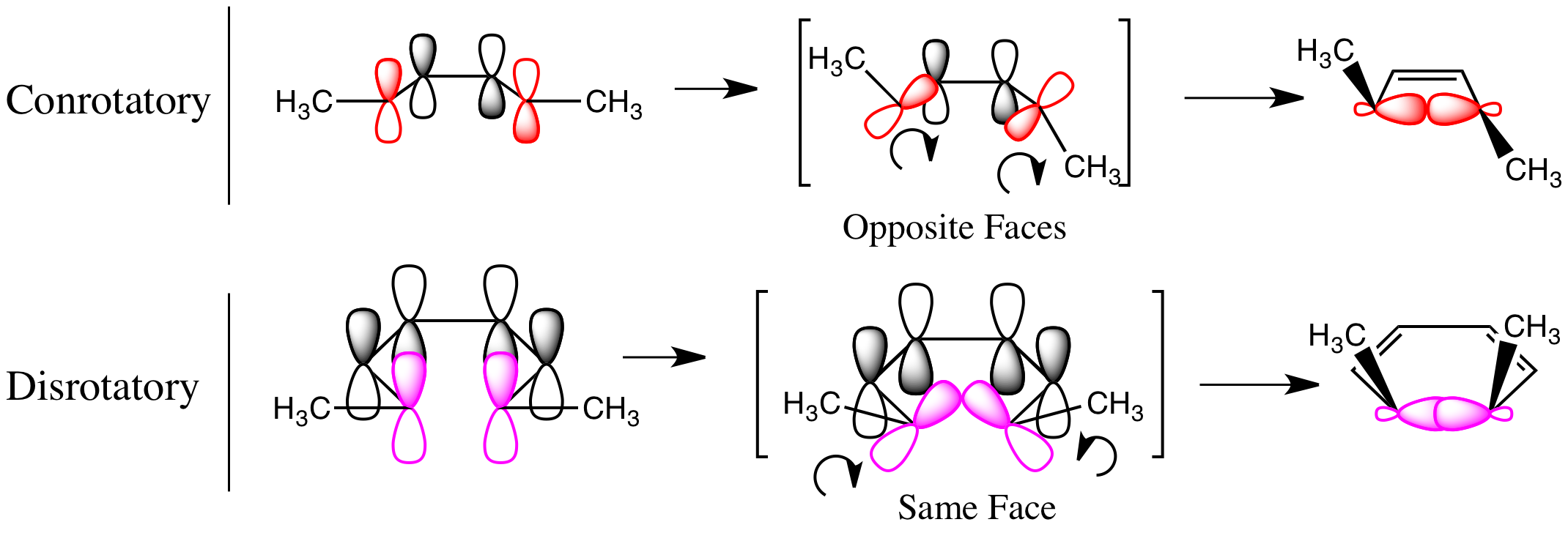
Conrotatory motion is antarafacial, while disrotatory motion is suprafacial.

In the generalized Woodward–Hoffmann rules, everything is characterized in terms of antarafacial and suprafacial bond topologies. The terms conrotatory and disrotatory are sufficient for describing the relative sense of bond rotation in electrocyclic ring closing or opening reactions, as illustrated on the right. However, they are unsuitable for describing the topologies of bond forming and breaking taking place in a general pericyclic reaction. As described in detail below, in the general formulation of the Woodward–Hoffmann rules, the bond rotation terms conrotatory and disrotatory are subsumed by the bond topology (or faciality) terms antarafacial and suprafacial, respectively. These descriptors can be used to characterize the topology of the bond forming and breaking that takes place in any pericyclic process.

=== Woodward-Hoffmann notation ===
A component is any part of a molecule or molecules that function as a unit in a pericyclic reaction. A component consists of one or more atoms and any of the following types of associated orbitals:

- An isolated p- or sp^{x}-orbital (unfilled or filled, symbol ω)
- A conjugated π system (symbol π)
- A σ bond (symbol σ)

The electron count of a component is the number of electrons in the orbital(s) of the component:

- The electron count of an unfilled ω orbital (i.e., an empty p orbital) is 0, while that of a filled ω orbital (i.e., a lone pair) is 2.
- The electron count of a conjugated π system with n double bonds is 2n (or 2n + 2, if a (formal) lone pair from a heteroatom or carbanion is conjugated thereto).
- The electron count of a σ bond is 2.

The bond topology of a component can be suprafacial and antarafacial:

- The relationship is suprafacial (symbol: s) when the interactions with the π system or p orbital occur on the same side of the nodal plane (think syn). For a σ bond, it corresponds to interactions occurring on the two "interior" lobes or two "exterior" lobes of the bond.
- The relationship is antarafacial (symbol: a) when the interactions with the π system or p orbital occur on opposite sides of the nodal plane (think anti). For a σ bond, it corresponds to interactions occurring on one "interior" lobe and one "exterior" lobe of the bond.

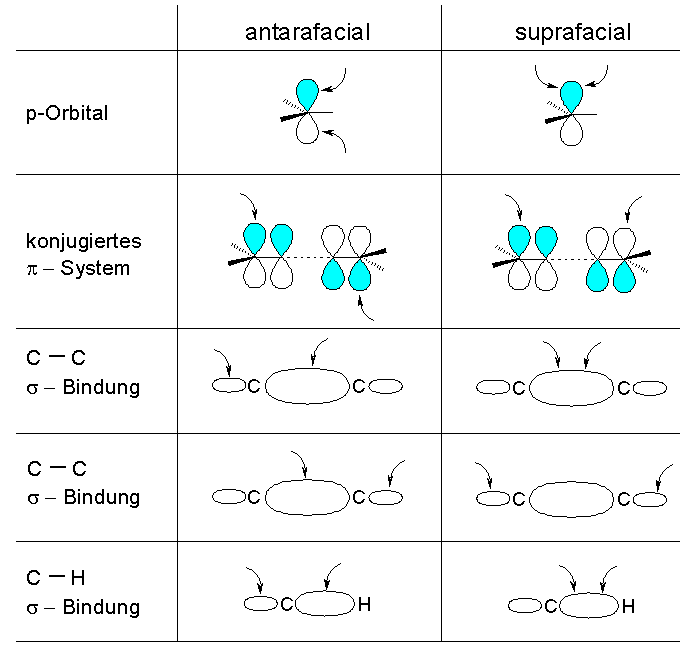
Illustration of the assignment of orbital overlap as suprafacial or antarafacial for common pericyclic components.

Using this notation, all pericyclic reactions can be assigned a descriptor, consisting of a series of symbols _{σ/π/ω}N_{s/a}, connected by + signs and enclosed in brackets, describing, in order, the type of orbital(s), number of electrons, and bond topology involved for each component. Some illustrative examples follow:

- The Diels-Alder reaction (a (4+2)-cycloaddition) is [_{π}4_{s} + _{π}2_{s}].
- The 1,3-dipolar cycloaddition of ozone and an olefin in the first step of ozonolysis (a (3+2)-cycloaddition) is [_{π}4_{s} + _{π}2_{s}].
- The cheletropic addition of sulfur dioxide to 1,3-butadiene (a (4+1)-cheletropic addition) is [_{ω}0_{a} + _{π}4_{s}] + [_{ω}2_{s} + _{π}4_{s}].
- The Cope rearrangement (a [3,3]-sigmatropic shift) is [_{π}2_{s} + _{σ}2_{s} + _{π}2_{s}] or [_{π}2_{a} + _{σ}2_{s} + _{π}2_{a}].
- The [1,3]-alkyl migration with inversion at carbon discovered by Berson (a [1,3]-sigmatropic shift) is [_{σ}2_{a} + _{π}2_{s}].
- The conrotatory electrocyclic ring closing of 1,3-butadiene (a 4π-electrocyclization) is [_{π}4_{s}].
- The conrotatory electrocyclic ring opening of cyclobutene (a reverse 4π-electrocyclization) is [_{σ}2_{a} + _{π}2_{s}] or [_{σ}2_{s} + _{π}2_{a}].
- The disrotatory electrocyclic ring closing of 1,3-cyclooctadien-5-ide anion (a 6π-electrocyclization) is [_{π}6_{s}].
- A Wagner-Meerwein shift of a carbocation (a [1,2]-sigmatropic shift) is [_{ω}0_{s} + _{σ}2_{s}].

Antarafacial and suprafacial are associated with (conrotation or inversion) and (disrotation or retention), respectively. A single descriptor may correspond to two pericyclic processes that are chemically distinct, that a reaction and its microscopic reverse are often described with two different descriptors, and that a single process may have more than a one correct descriptor. One can verify, using the pericyclic selection rule given below, that all of these reactions are allowed processes.

=== Original statement ===
Using this notation, Woodward and Hoffmann state in their 1969 review the general formulation for all pericyclic reactions as follows:

A ground-state pericyclic change is symmetry-allowed when the total number of (4q+2)_{s} and (4r)_{a} components is odd.

Here, (4q + 2)_{s} and (4r)_{a} refer to suprafacial (4q + 2)-electron and antarafacial (4r)-electron components, respectively. Moreover, this criterion should be interpreted as both sufficient (stated above) as well as necessary (not explicitly stated above, see: if and only if)

=== Derivation of an alternative statement ===
Alternatively, the general statement can be formulated in terms of the total number of electrons using simple rules of divisibility by a straightforward analysis of two cases.

First, consider the case where the total number of electrons is 4n + 2:

4n + 2 = a(4q + 2)_{s} + b(4p + 2)_{a} + c(4t)_{s} + d(4r)_{a},

where a, b, c, and d are coefficients indicating the number of each type of component. This equation implies that one of, but not both, a or b is odd, for if a and b are both even or both odd, then the sum of the four terms is 0 (mod 4).

The generalized statement of the Woodward–Hoffmann rules states that a + d is odd if the reaction is allowed. Now, if a is even, then this implies that d is odd. Since b is odd in this case, the number of antarafacial components, b + d, is even. Likewise, if a is odd, then d is even. Since b even in this case, the number of antarafacial components, b + d, is again even. Thus, regardless of the initial assumption of parity for a and b, the number of antarafacial components is even when the electron count is 4n + 2. Contrariwise,, b + d is odd.

In the case where the total number of electrons is 4n, similar arguments (omitted here) lead to the conclusion that the number of antarafacial components b + d must be odd in the allowed case and even in the forbidden case.

Finally, to complete the argument, and show that this new criterion is truly equivalent to the original criterion, one needs to argue the converse statements as well, namely, that the number of antarafacial components b + d and the electron count (4n + 2 or 4n) implies the parity of a + d that is given by the Woodward–Hoffmann rules (odd for allowed, even for forbidden). Another round of (somewhat tedious) case analyses will easily show this to be the case. The pericyclic selection rule states:

A pericyclic process involving 4n+2 or 4n electrons is thermally allowed if and only if the number of antarafacial components involved is even or odd, respectively.

Summary of the results of the equivalent Dewar–Zimmerman aromatic transition state theory
	Hückel	Möbius
4n+2 e^{–}	Allowed aromatic	Forbidden anti-aromatic
4n e^{–}	Forbidden anti-aromatic	Allowed aromatic

In this formulation, the electron count refers to the entire reacting system, rather than to individual components, as enumerated in Woodward and Hoffmann's original statement. In practice, an even or odd number of antarafacial components usually means zero or one antarafacial components, respectively, as transition states involving two or more antarafacial components are typically disfavored by strain. As exceptions, certain intramolecular reactions may be geometrically constrained in such a way that enforces an antarafacial trajectory for multiple components. In addition, in some cases, e.g., the Cope rearrangement, the same (not necessarily strained) transition state geometry can be considered to contain two supra or two antara π components, depending on how one draws the connections between orbital lobes. (This ambiguity is a consequence of the convention that overlap of either both interior or both exterior lobes of a σ component can be considered to be suprafacial.)

This alternative formulation makes the equivalence of the Woodward–Hoffmann rules to the Dewar–Zimmerman analysis (see below) clear. An even total number of phase inversions is equivalent to an even number of antarafacial components and corresponds to Hückel topology, requiring 4n + 2 electrons for aromaticity, while an odd total number of phase inversions is equivalent to an odd number of antarafacial components and corresponds to Möbius topology, requiring 4n electrons for aromaticity. To summarize aromatic transition state theory: Thermal pericyclic reactions proceed via (4n + 2)-electron Hückel or (4n)-electron Möbius transition states.

As a mnemonic, the above formulation can be further restated as the following:

A ground-state pericyclic process involving N electron pairs and A antarafacial components is symmetry-allowed if and only if N + A is odd.

=== Alternative proof of equivalence ===
The equivalence of the two formulations can also be seen by a simple parity argument without appeal to case analysis.

Proposition. The following formulations of the Woodward–Hoffmann rules are equivalent:

(A) For a pericyclic reaction, if the sum of the number of suprafacial 4q + 2 components and antarafacial 4r components is odd then it is thermally allowed; otherwise the reaction is thermally forbidden.

(B) For a pericyclic reaction, if the total number of antarafacial components of a (4n + 2)-electron reaction is even or the total number of antarafacial components of a 4n-electron reaction is odd then it is thermally allowed; otherwise the reaction is thermally forbidden.

Proof of equivalence: Index the components of a k-component pericyclic reaction $i=1,2,\ldots, k$ and assign component i with Woodward-Hoffmann symbol _{σ/π/ω}N_{s/a} the electron count and topology parity symbol $(n_i,p_i,i)$ according to the following rules:

$$n_i = \begin{cases} 0, & N\equiv 0\ (\mathrm{mod}\ 4)\\ 1, & N\equiv 2\ (\mathrm{mod}\ 4) \end{cases}\quad\mathrm{and}\quad
p_i = \begin{cases} 0, & i\text{ is supra}\\ 1, & i\text{ is antara} \end{cases}.$$

We have a mathematically equivalent restatement of (A):

(A') A collection of symbols $\{(n_i,p_i,i)\}$ is thermally allowed if and only if the number of symbols with the property $n_i\neq p_i$ is odd.

Since the total electron count is 4n + 2 or 4n precisely when $\sum_i n_i$ (the number of (4q + 2)-electron components) is odd or even, respectively, while $\sum_i p_i$ gives the number of antarafacial components, we can also restate (B):

(B') A collection of symbols $\{(n_i,p_i,i)\}$ is thermally allowed if and only if exactly one of $\sum_i n_i$ or $\sum_i p_i$ is odd.

It suffices to show that (A') and (B') are equivalent. Exactly one of $\sum_i n_i$ or $\sum_i p_i$ is odd if and only if $\sum_i n_i+\sum_i p_i = \sum_i n_i+p_i$ is odd. If $n_i = p_i$, $n_i+p_i\equiv 0\ (\mathrm{mod}\ 2)$ holds; hence, omission of symbols with the property $n_i = p_i$ from a collection will not change the parity of $\sum_i n_i+p_i$. On the other hand, when $n_i\neq p_i$, we have $n_i+p_i = 1$, but $\sum_{n_i\neq p_i} 1$ simply enumerates the number of components with the property $n_i\neq p_i$. Therefore,

$\sum_i n_i+p_i\equiv\sum_{n_i\neq p_i} n_i+p_i= \sum_{n_i\neq p_i} 1=\#\{(n_i,p_i,i)\ |\ n_i\neq p_i\}\ (\mathrm{mod}\ 2)$.

Thus, $\sum_i n_i+p_i$ and the number of symbols in a collection with the property $n_i\neq p_i$ have the same parity. Since formulations (A') and (B') are equivalent, so are (A) and (B), as claimed. □

To give a concrete example, a hypothetical reaction with the descriptor [_{π}6_{s} + _{π}4_{a} + _{π}2_{a}] would be assigned the collection {(1, 0, 1), (0, 1, 2), (1, 1, 3)} in the scheme above. There are two components, (1, 0, 1) and (0, 1, 2), with the property $n_i\neq p_i$, so the reaction is not allowed by (A'). Likewise, $\sum_i n_i=2$ and $\sum_i p_i=2$ are both even, so (B') yields the same conclusion (as it must): the reaction is not allowed.

=== Examples ===
This formulation for a 2 component reaction is equivalent to the selection rules for a [p + q]-cycloaddition reactions shown in the following table:

p + q	Thermally allowed	Photochemically allowed
4n	p_{s} + q_{a} or p_{a} + q_{s}	p_{s} + q_{s} or p_{a} + q_{a}
4n + 2	p_{s} + q_{s} or p_{a} + q_{a}	p_{s} + q_{a} or p_{a} + q_{s}

If the total number of electrons is 4n + 2, then one is in the bottom row of the table. The reaction is thermally allowed if it is suprafacial with respect to both components or antarafacial with respect to both components. That is to say the number of antarafacial components is even (it is 0 or 2). Similarly if the total number of electrons is 4n, then one is in the top row of the table. This is thermally allowed if it is suprafacial with respect to one component and antarafacial with respect to the other. Thus the total number of antarafacial components is always odd as it is always 1.

The following are some common ground state (i.e. thermal) reaction classes analyzed in light of the generalized Woodward–Hoffmann rules.

==== [2+2] Cycloaddition ====
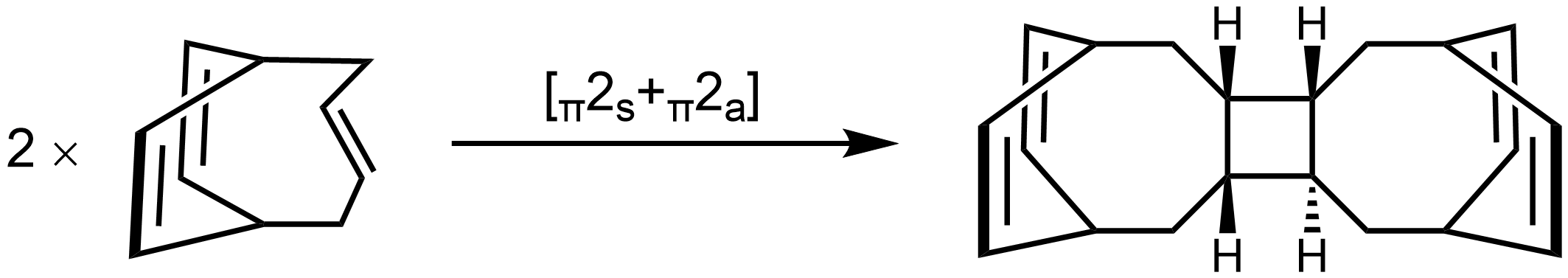
A thermally-allowed supra-antara [2+2]-dimerization of a strained trans-olefin

A [2+2]-cycloaddition is a 4 electron process that brings together two components. Thus, by the above general WH rules, it is only allowed if the reaction is antarafacial with respect to exactly one component. This is the same conclusion reached with correlation diagrams in the section above.

A rare but stereochemically unambiguous example of a [_{π}2_{s} + _{π}2_{a}]-cycloaddition is shown on the right. The strain and steric properties of the trans double bond enables this generally kinetically unfavorable process. cis, trans-1,5-Cyclooctadiene is also believed to undergo dimerization via this mode. Ketenes are a large class of reactants favoring [2 + 2] cycloaddition with olefins. The MO analysis of ketene cycloaddition is rendered complicated and ambiguous by the simultaneous but independent interaction of the orthogonal orbitals of the ketene but may involve a [_{π}2_{s} + _{π}2_{a}] interaction as well.

==== [4+2] Cycloaddition ====
The synchronous 6π-electron Diels-Alder reaction is a [_{π}4_{s} + _{π}2_{s}]-cycloaddition (i.e. suprafacial with respect to both components), as exemplified by the reaction to the right.

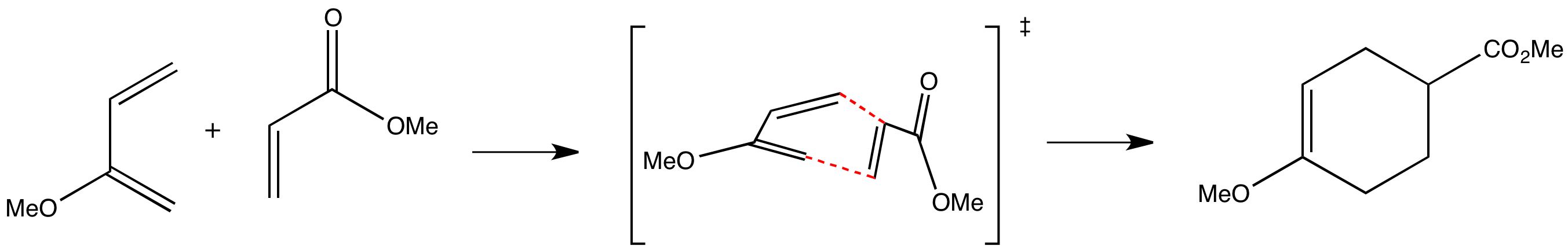
The Diels-Alder reaction is suprafacial with respect to both components.

Thus as the total number of antarafacial components is 0, which is even, the reaction is symmetry-allowed. This prediction agrees with experiment as the Diels-Alder reaction is a rather facile pericyclic reaction.

==== 4n Electrocyclic Reaction ====
A 4n electron electrocyclic ring opening reaction can be considered to have 2 components – the π-system and the breaking σ-bond. With respect to the π-system, the reaction is suprafacial. However, with a conrotatory mechanism, as shown in the figure above, the reaction is antarafacial with respect to the σ-bond. Conversely with a disrotatory mechanism it is suprafacial with respect to the breaking σ-bond.

By the above rules, for a 4n electron pericyclic reaction of 2 components, there must be one antarafacial component. Thus the reaction must proceed through a conrotatory mechanism. This agrees with the result derived in the correlation diagrams above.

==== 4n + 2 electrocyclic reaction ====
A 4n + 2 electrocyclic ring opening reaction is also a 2-component pericyclic reaction which is suprafacial with respect to the π-system. Thus, in order for the reaction to be allowed, the number of antarafacial components must be 0, i.e. it must be suprafacial with respect to the breaking σ-bond as well. Thus a disrotatory mechanism is symmetry-allowed.

==== [1,j]-sigmatropic rearrangement ====
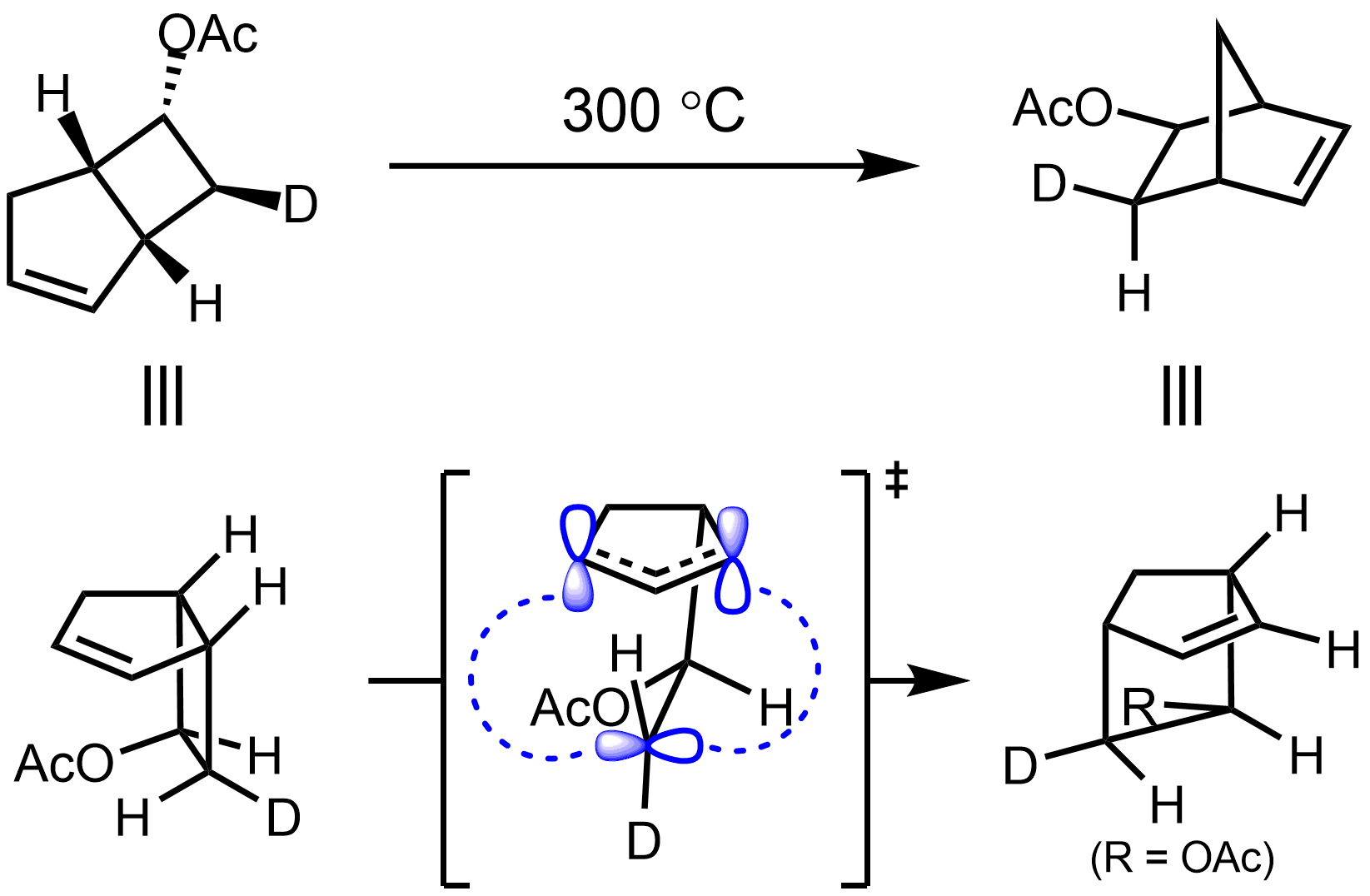
Berson's classic (1967) example of a [1,3]-sigmatropic alkyl shift proceeding with stereochemical inversion (WH symbol [_{σ}2_{a} + _{π}2_{s}])

A [1,j]-sigmatropic rearrangement is also a two component pericyclic reaction: one component is the π-system, the other component is the migrating group. The simplest case is a [1,j]-hydride shift across a π-system where j is odd. In this case, as the hydrogen has only a spherically symmetric s orbital, the reaction must be suprafacial with respect to the hydrogen. The total number of electrons involved is (j + 1) as there are (j − 1)/2 π-bond plus the σ bond involved in the reaction. If j = 4n − 1 then it must be antarafacial, and if j = 4n + 1, then it must be suprafacial. This agrees with experiment that [1,3]-hydride shifts are generally not observed as the symmetry-allowed antarafacial process is not feasible, but [1,5]-hydride shifts are quite facile.

For a [1,j]-alkyl shift, where the reaction can be antarafacial (i.e. invert stereochemistry) with respect to the carbon center, the same rules apply. If j = 4n − 1 then the reaction is symmetry-allowed if it is either antarafacial with respect to the π-system, or inverts stereochemistry at the carbon. If j = 4n + 1 then the reaction is symmetry-allowed if it is suprafacial with respect to the π-system and retains stereochemistry at the carbon center.

On the right is one of the first examples of a [1,3]-sigmatropic shift to be discovered, reported by Berson in 1967. In order to allow for inversion of configuration, as the σ bond breaks, the C(H)(D) moiety twists around at the transition state, with the hybridization of the carbon approximating sp^{2}, so that the remaining unhybridized p orbital maintains overlap with both carbons 1 and 3.

== Equivalence of other theoretical models ==
=== Dewar–Zimmerman analysis ===
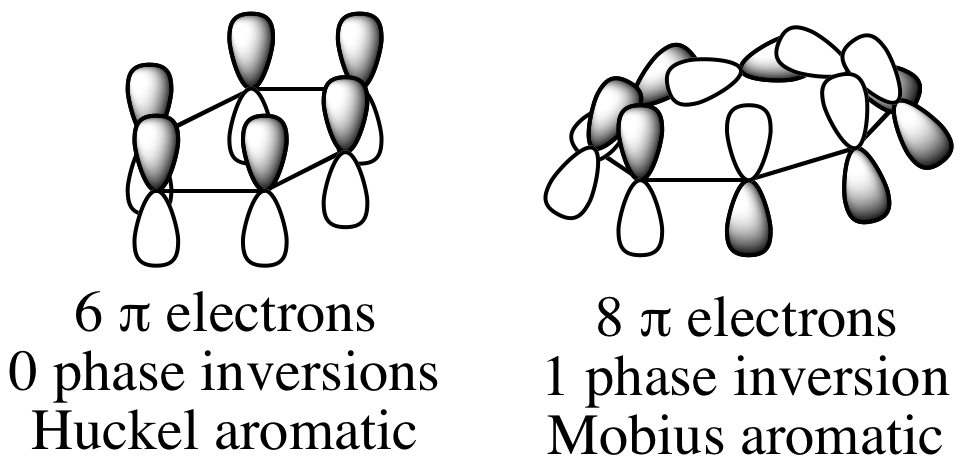
Hypothetical Huckel versus Mobius aromaticity.

The generalized Woodward–Hoffmann rules, first given in 1969, are equivalent to an earlier general approach, the Möbius-Hückel concept of Zimmerman, which was first stated in 1966 and is also known as aromatic transition state theory. As its central tenet, aromatic transition state theory holds that 'allowed' pericyclic reactions proceed via transition states with aromatic character, while 'forbidden' pericyclic reactions would encounter transition states that are antiaromatic in nature. In the Dewar-Zimmerman analysis, one is concerned with the topology of the transition state of the pericyclic reaction. If the transition state involves 4n electrons, the Möbius topology is aromatic and the Hückel topology is antiaromatic, while if the transition state involves 4n + 2 electrons, the Hückel topology is aromatic and the Möbius topology is antiaromatic. The parity of the number of phase inversions (described in detail below) in the transition state determines its topology. A Möbius topology involves an odd number of phase inversions whereas a Hückel topology involves an even number of phase inversions.

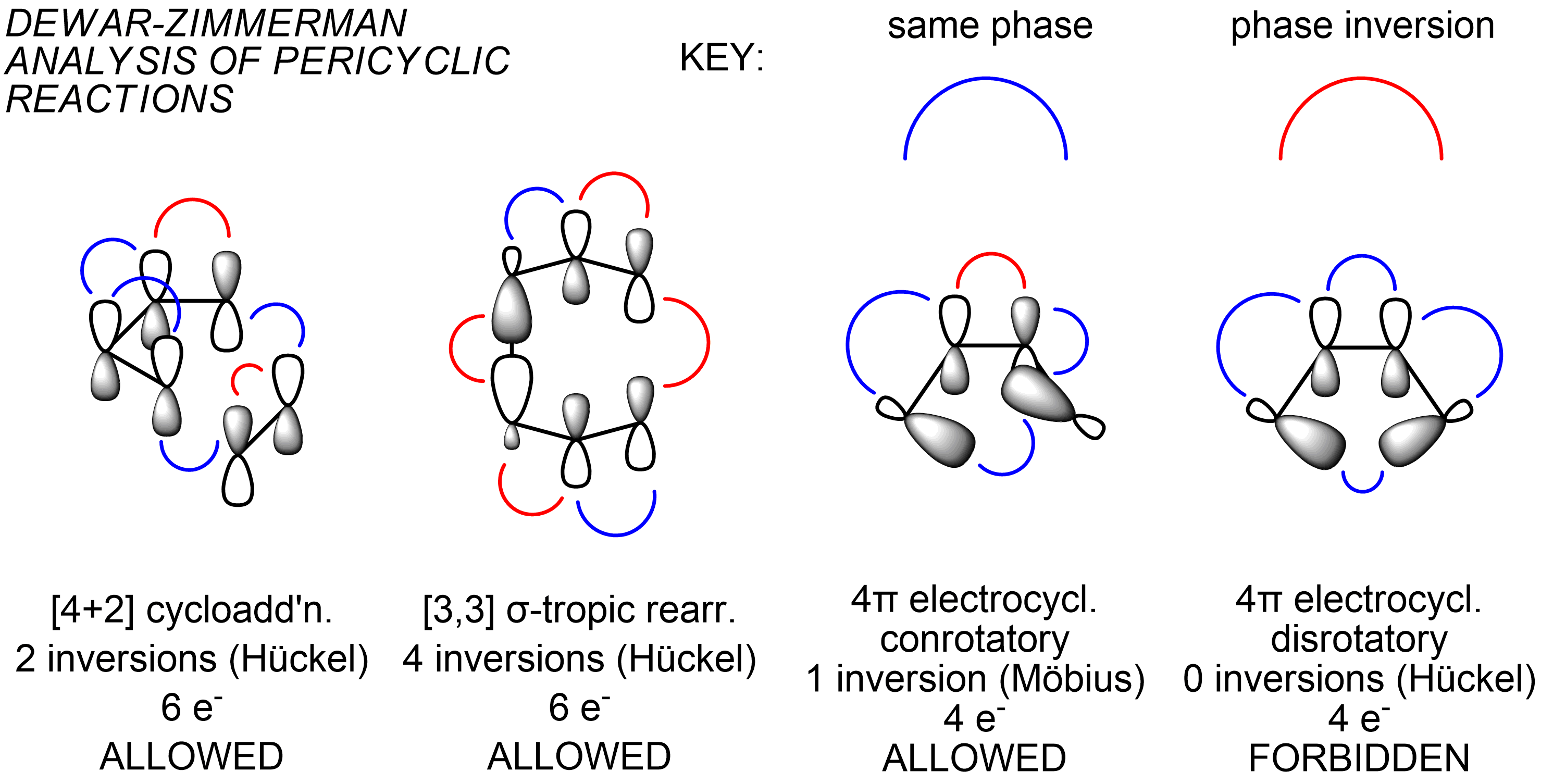
Examples of Dewar-Zimmerman analysis applied to common pericyclic reactions. (The red curves represent phase inversions.)

In connection with Woodward–Hoffmann terminology, the number of antarafacial components and the number of phase inversions always have the same parity. Consequently, an odd number of antarafacial components gives Möbius topology, while an even number gives Hückel topology. Thus, to restate the results of aromatic transition state theory in the language of Woodward and Hoffmann, a 4n-electron reaction is thermally allowed if and only if it has an odd number of antarafacial components (i.e., Möbius topology); a (4n + 2)-electron reaction is thermally allowed if and only if it has an even number of antarafacial components (i.e., Hückel topology).

Procedure for Dewar-Zimmerman analysis (examples shown on the right): Step 1. Shade in all basis orbitals that are part of the pericyclic system. The shading can be arbitrary. In particular the shading does not need to reflect the phasing of the polyene MOs; each basis orbital simply need to have two oppositely phased lobes in the case of p or sp^{x} hybrid orbitals, or a single phase in the case of an s orbital. Step 2. Draw connections between the lobes of basis orbitals that are geometrically well-disposed to interact at the transition state. The connections to be made depend on the transition state topology. (For example, in the figure, different connections are shown in the cases of con- and disrotatory electrocyclization.) Step 3. Count the number of connections that occur between lobes of opposite shading: each of these connections constitutes a phase inversion. If the number of phase inversions is even, the transition state is Hückel, while if the number of phase inversions is odd, the transition state is Möbius. Step 4. Conclude that the pericyclic reaction is allowed if the electron count is 4n + 2 and the transition state is Hückel, or if the electron count is 4n and the transition state is Möbius; otherwise, conclude that the pericyclic reaction is forbidden.

Importantly, any scheme of assigning relative phases to the basis orbitals is acceptable, as inverting the phase of any single orbital adds 0 or ±2 phase inversions to the total, an even number, so that the parity of the number of inversions (number of inversions modulo 2) is unchanged.

=== Reinterpretation with conceptual density functional theory ===
Recently, the Woodward–Hoffmann rules have been reinterpreted using conceptual density functional theory (DFT). The key to the analysis is the dual descriptor function, proposed by Christophe Morell, André Grand and Alejandro Toro-Labbé $f^{(2)}(r) = \frac{\partial^2 \rho(r)}{\partial N^2}$, the second derivative of the electron density $\rho(r)$ with respect to the number of electrons $N$. This response function is important as the reaction of two components A and B involving a transfer of electrons will depend on the responsiveness of the electron density to electron donation or acceptance, i.e. the derivative of the Fukui function $f(r) = \frac{\partial \rho(r)}{\partial N}$. In fact, from a simplistic viewpoint, the dual descriptor function gives a readout on the electrophilicity or nucleophilicity of the various regions of the molecule. For $f^{(2)}>0$, the region is electrophilic, and for $f^{(2)}<0$, the region is nucleophilic. Using the frontier molecular orbital assumption and a finite difference approximation of the Fukui function, one may write the dual descriptor as

$$f^{(2)}(r) = \frac{\partial f(r)}{\partial N} \cong |\phi_{\text{LUMO}}(r)|^2-|\phi_{\text{HOMO}}(r)|^2$$

This makes intuitive sense as if a region is better at accepting electrons than donating, then the LUMO must dominate and dual descriptor function will be positive. Conversely, if a region is better at donating electrons then the HOMO term will dominate and the descriptor will be negative. Notice that although the concept of phase and orbitals are replaced simply by the notion of electron density, this function still takes both positive and negative values.

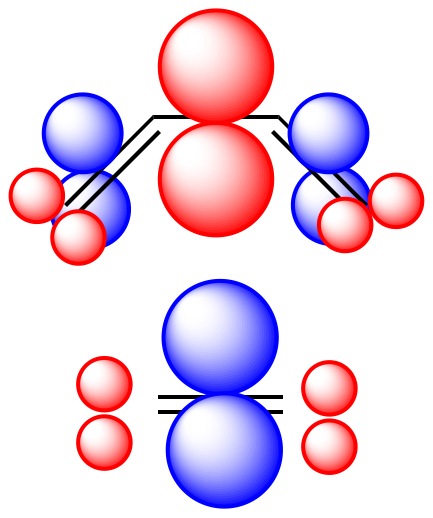
Dual-descriptor coloring (red>0, blue<0) of electron density in the Diels-Alder supra/supra transition state.

The Woodward–Hoffmann rules are reinterpreted using this formulation by matching favorable interactions between regions of electron density for which the dual descriptor has opposite signs. This is equivalent to maximizing predicted favorable interactions and minimizing repulsive interactions. For the case of a [4+2] cycloaddition, a simplified schematic of the reactants with the dual descriptor function colored (red=positive, blue=negative) is shown in the optimal supra/supra configuration to the left. This method correctly predicts the WH rules for the major classes of pericyclic reactions.

== Exceptions ==
In Chapter 12 of The Conservation of Orbital Symmetry, entitled "Violations," Woodward and Hoffmann famously stated:

There are none! Nor can violations be expected of so fundamental a principle of maximum bonding.

This pronouncement notwithstanding, it is important to recognize that the Woodward–Hoffmann rules are used to predict relative barrier heights, and thus likely reaction mechanisms, and that they only take into account barriers due to conservation of orbital symmetry. Thus it is not guaranteed that a WH symmetry-allowed reaction actually takes place in a facile manner. Conversely, it is possible, upon enough energetic input, to achieve an anti-Woodward-Hoffmann product. This is especially prevalent in sterically constrained systems, where the WH-product has an added steric barrier to overcome. For example, in the electrocyclic ring-opening of the dimethylbicyclo[0.2.3]heptene derivative (1), a conrotatory mechanism is not possible due to resulting angle strain and the reaction proceeds slowly through a disrotatory mechanism at 400^{o} C to give a cycloheptadiene product. Violations may also be observed in cases with very strong thermodynamic driving forces. The decomposition of dioxetane-1,2-dione to two molecules of carbon dioxide, famous for its role in the luminescence of glowsticks, has been scrutinized computationally. In the absence of fluorescers, the reaction is now believed to proceed in a concerted (though asynchronous) fashion, via a retro-[2+2]-cycloaddition that formally violates the Woodward–Hoffmann rules.

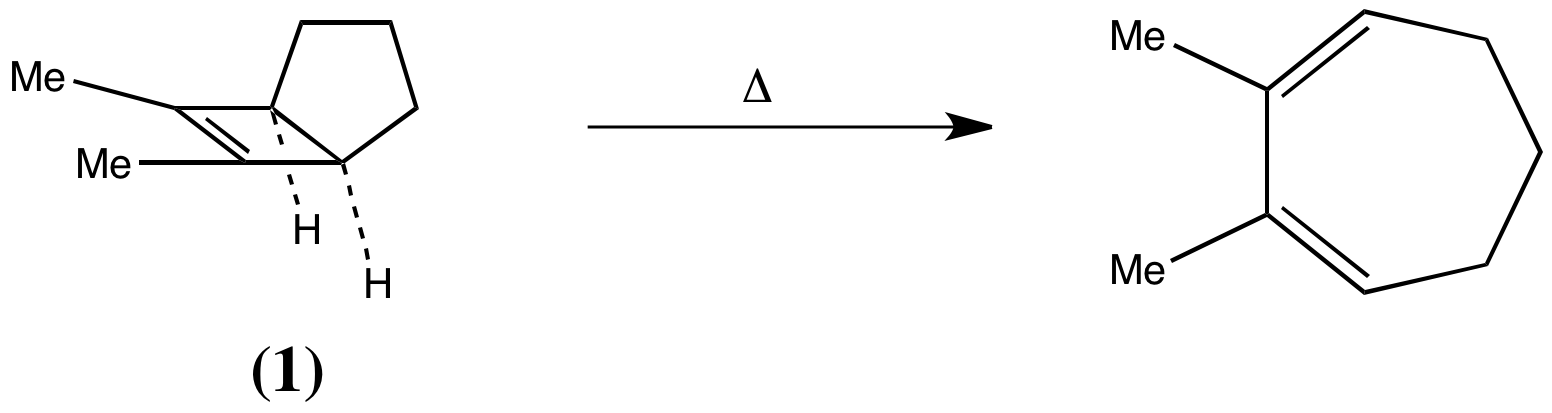
Anti-WH product via disrotatory mechanism induced by ring strain.

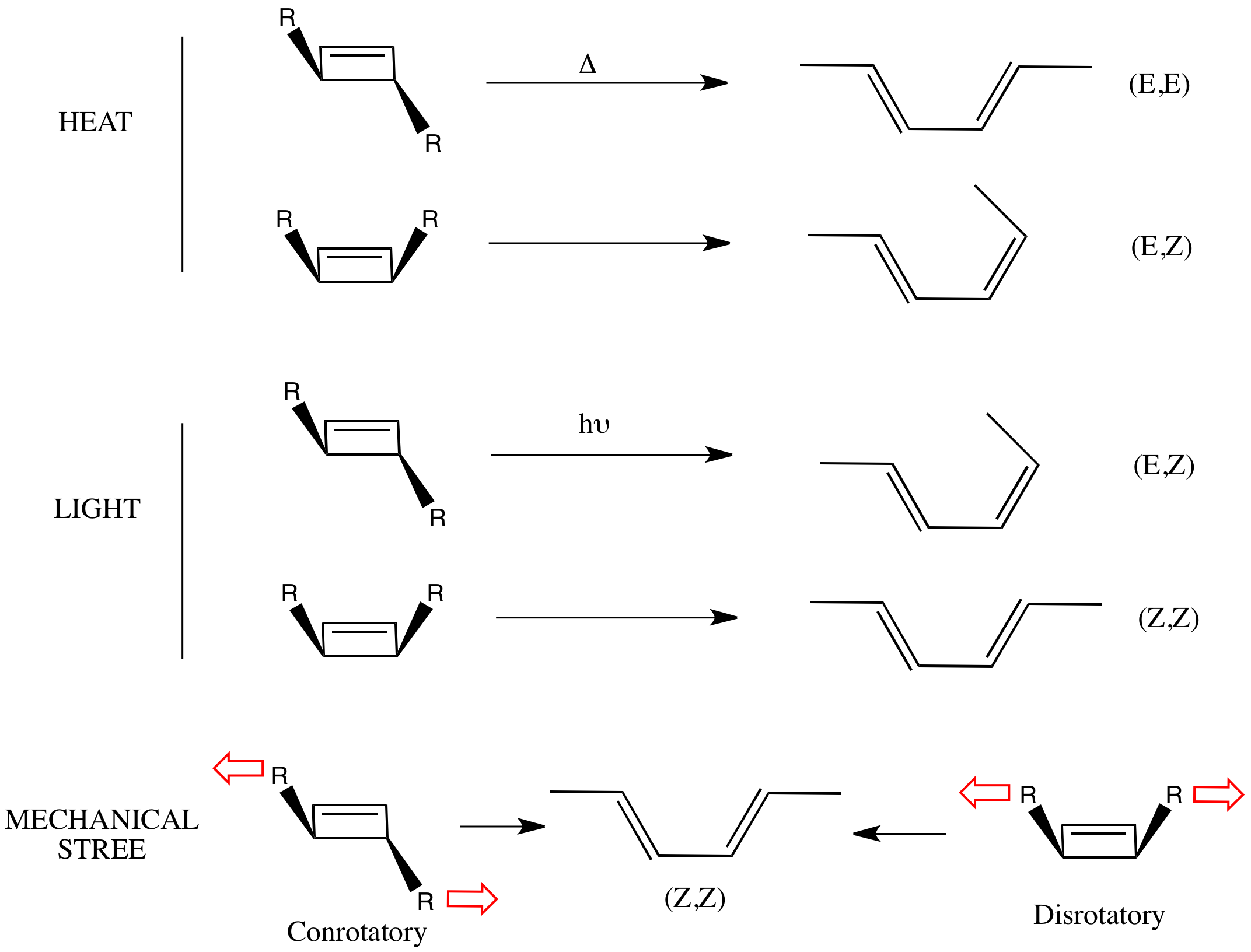
Computationally predicted products of 4e electrocyclic ring opening under thermal, photo, and mechanical control.

Similarly, a recent paper describes how mechanical stress can be used to reshape chemical reaction pathways to lead to products that apparently violate Woodward–Hoffman rules. In this paper, they use ultrasound irradiation to induce a mechanical stress on link-functionalized polymers attached syn or anti on the cyclobutene ring. Computational studies predict that the mechanical force, resulting from friction of the polymers, induces bond lengthening along the reaction coordinate of the conrotatory mechanism in the anti-bisubstituted-cyclobutene, and along the reaction coordinate of the disrotatory mechanism in the syn-bisubstituted-cyclobutene. Thus in the syn-bisubstituted-cyclobutene, the anti-WH product is predicted to be formed.

This computational prediction was backed up by experiment on the system below. Link-functionalized polymers were conjugated to cis benzocyclobutene in both syn- and anti- conformations. As predicted, both products gave the same (Z,Z) product as determined by quenching by a stereospecific Diels-Alder reaction with the substituted maleimide. In particular, the syn-substituted product gave the anti-WH product, presumably as the mechanical stretching along the coordinate of the disrotatory pathway lowered the barrier of the reaction under the disrotatory pathway enough to bias that mechanism.

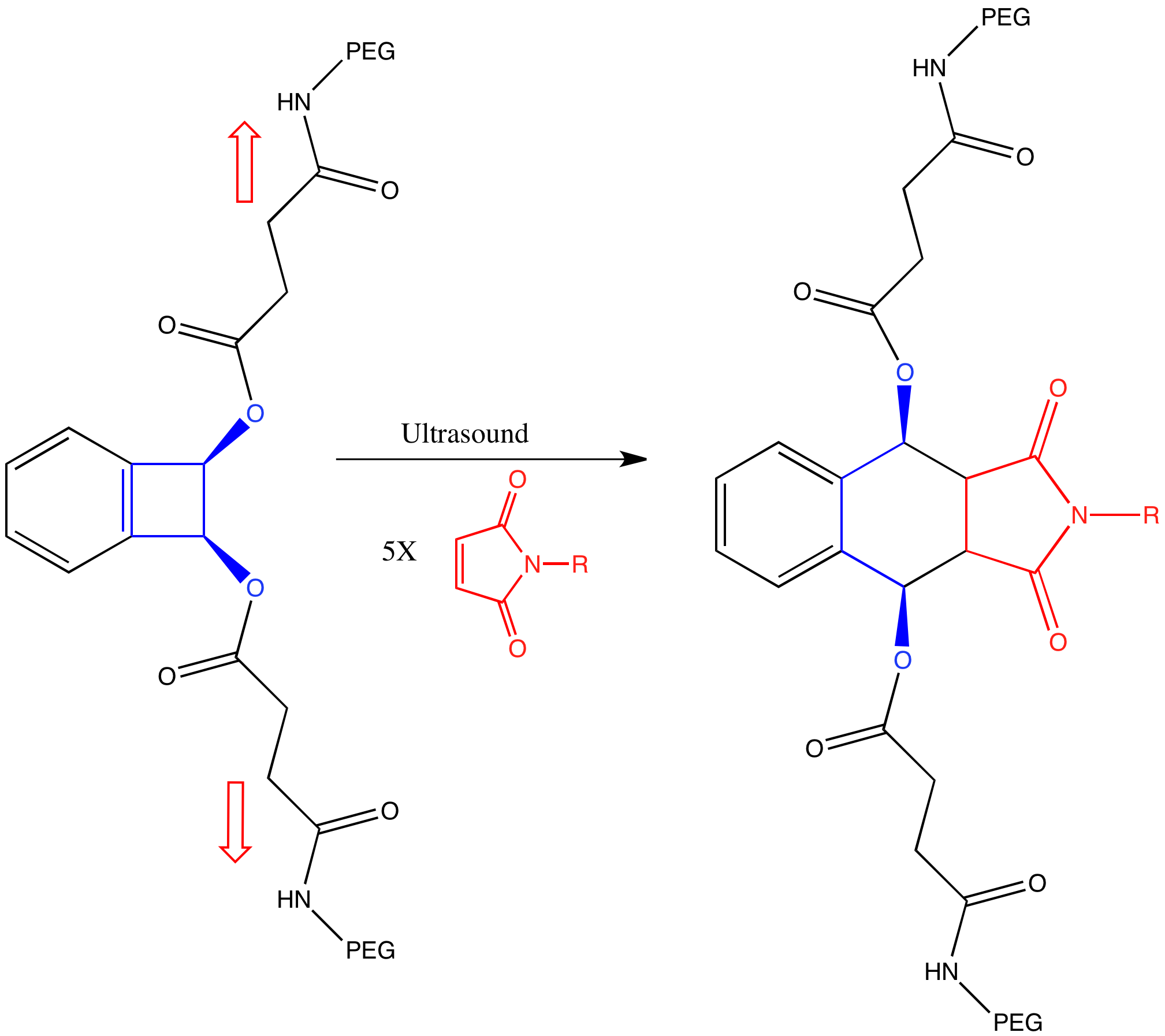

== See also ==
- Woodward's rules for calculating UV absorptions
- Torquoselectivity
