= C8H10 =

The molecular formula C_{8}H_{10} may refer to different structural isomers:

- Cycloocta-1,3,6-triene
- Ethylbenzene
- Octatetraene
- Xylenes
  - m-Xylene
  - o-Xylene
  - p-Xylene
- Bicyclo[4.2.0]octa-1,5-diene
- Bicyclo[4.2.0]octa-2,4-diene
