= Gilles Klopman =

American chemist

Dr. Gilles Klopman (February 24, 1933 – January 10, 2015) held the position of Charles F. Mabery Professor of Research in Chemistry; Professor of Oncology and Environmental Health Sciences; and Director of the Laboratory for Decision Support Methodologies at Case Western Reserve University in Cleveland, Ohio. Additionally, he served as an adjunct professor of Environmental and Occupational Health at the University of Pittsburgh.

Dr. Klopman received his education in Belgium and the United States, specializing in theoretical chemistry and physical organic chemistry (L. es Sc., University of Brussels (Belgium), 1956; Dr. es Sc., University of Brussels, 1960; Postdoctoral Fellow, University of Texas, 1965–66).

His notable contributions to the theory of chemical reactivity include the development of the Klopman–Salem equation, first described independently by him and Lionel Salem in 1968. It explains the energetic changes that occur when two chemical species approach each other in the course of a reaction. The Klopman–Salem equation provides a mathematical foundation for key assumptions in frontier molecular orbital theory and HSAB theory.

== Structure-Activity Studies of Biologically Active Molecules ==
His research, titled "Structure-Activity Studies of Biologically Active Molecules," focused on evaluating chemical reactivity. This involved experimental determination of reactivity indices and substituent constants, contributing to the development of reactivity theories. Professor Klopman made significant contributions to the concept of charge and orbital controlled reactions. His work, widely used to explain ambident selectivity of nucleophiles, links linear free energy type correlations to more fundamental chemical concepts. In the realm of quantum mechanics and computers, he designed and programmed the first semi-empirical method for calculating the properties of saturated molecules, later known as MINDO.

Dr. Klopman's expertise extended to artificial intelligence, where he applied it to correlate biological data and developed software for representing and manipulating chemical data. In recent years, his primary focus has been on determining quantitative structure-activity relationships in both carcinogenic and chemotherapeutic agents. This involves developing computer simulations to understand drug actions, seeking correlations between the chemical structure of drugs and their activity to produce better antitumor agents.

Furthermore, his work has contributed to developing quantitative relationships between the nature and intensity of odors and their chemical structure for the perfume industry (adapted from the CWRU website for the Department of Chemistry).

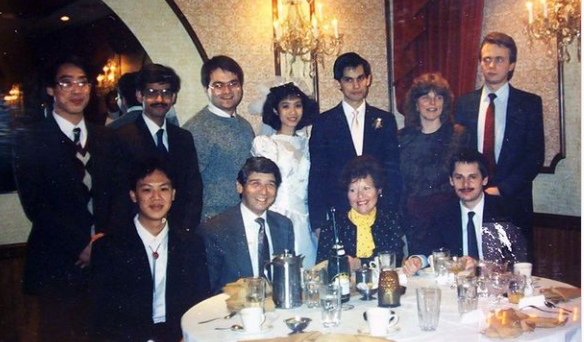
Celebratory dinner with students and post-doctorates in 1990.
