= Torquoselectivity =

Preference of an electrocyclic reaction towards inward or outward rotation of substituents

In stereochemistry, torquoselectivity is a special kind of stereoselectivity observed in electrocyclic reactions, defined as "the preference for inward or outward rotation of substituents in conrotatory or disrotatory electrocyclic reactions." Torquoselectivity is not to be confused with the normal diastereoselectivity seen in pericyclic reactions, as it represents a further level of selectivity beyond the Woodward-Hoffman rules. The name derives from the idea that the substituents in an electrocyclization appear to rotate over the course of the reaction, and thus selection of a single product is equivalent to selection of one direction of rotation (i.e. the direction of torque on the substituents). The concept was originally developed by American chemist Kendall N. Houk.

For ring closing reactions, it is an example of enantioselectivity, wherein a single enantiomer of a cyclization product is formed from the selective ring closure of the starting material. In a typical electrocyclic ring closing, selection for either conrotatory or disrotatory reactions modes still produces two enantiomers. Torquoselectivity is a discrimination between these possible enantiomers that requires asymmetric induction.

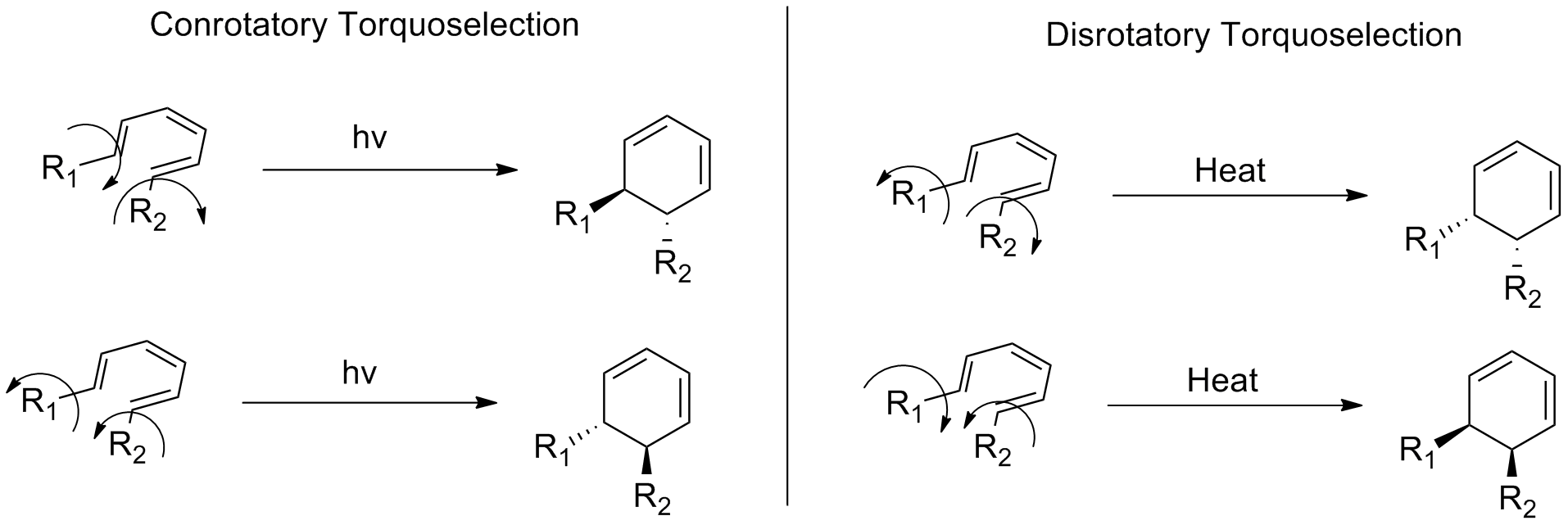
Conrotatory and disrotatory modes of rotation each showing two possible directions of rotation that result in pairs of enantiomers for a generic hexatriene system. Note: in the case shown, there is no reason for the reaction to be torquoselective and both products would be expected for any particular set of conditions.

Torquoselectivity is also used to describe selective electrocyclic ring openings, in which different directions of rotation produce distinct structural isomers. In these cases, steric strain is often the driving force for the selectivity. Studies have shown that the selectivity can also be changed by the presence of electron donating and electron withdrawing groups.

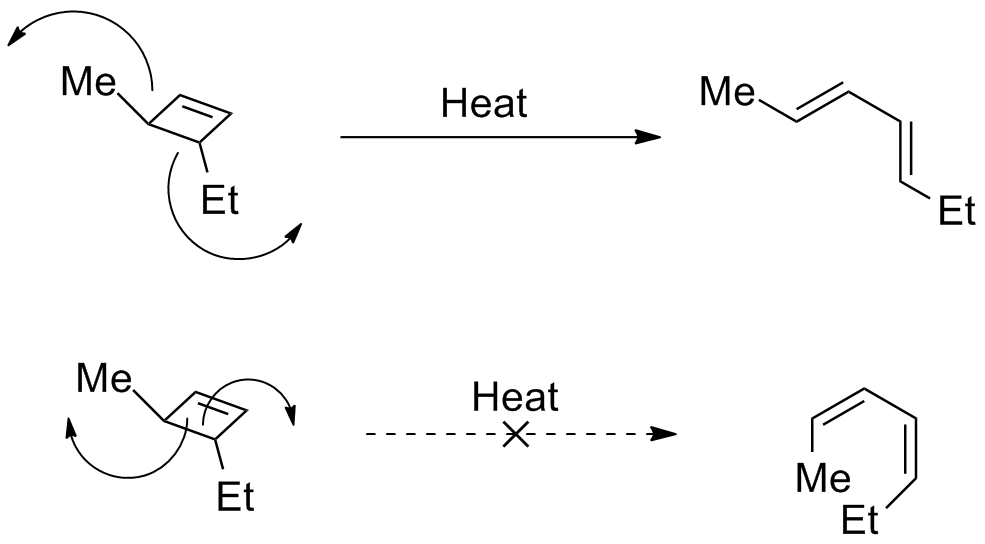
Thermal electrocyclic ring opening of a cyclobutene giving selectivity via steric strain

Other mechanisms by which torquoselectivity can operate include chiral Lewis acid catalysts, induction via neighboring stereocenters (in which case the torquoselectivity is a case of diastereoselectivity), and axial-to-tetrahedral chirality transfer. An example of the latter case is shown below for the torquoselective Nazarov cyclization reaction of a chiral allenyl vinyl ketone.

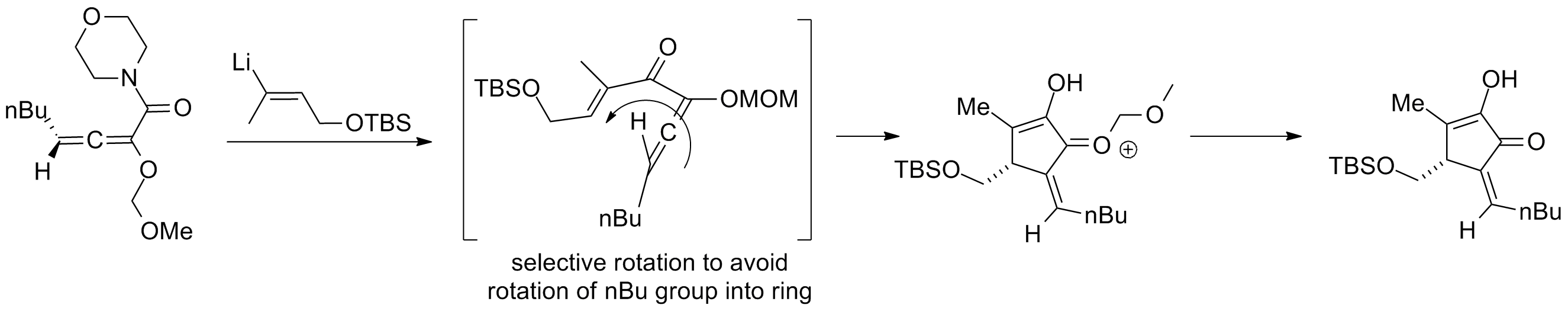
Torquoselectivity via axial to tetrahedral chirality transfer in the Nazarov cyclization of allenyl vinyl ketones
