= Cyclopentenone =

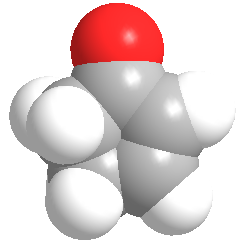

Names
- Preferred IUPAC name Cyclopent-2-en-1-one

Identifiers
CAS Number	930-30-3
3D model (JSmol)	Interactive image
ChEBI	CHEBI:141550
ChEMBL	ChEMBL52190
ChemSpider	12999
ECHA InfoCard	100.012.012
PubChem CID	13588
UNII	Q0U2IGF9CK
CompTox Dashboard (EPA)	DTXSID60870802
- InChI: InChI=1S/C5H6O/c6-5-3-1-2-4-5/h1,3H,2,4H2 Key: BZKFMUIJRXWWQK-UHFFFAOYSA-N
- SMILES: C1CC(=O)C=C1

Properties
Chemical formula	C_{5}H_{6}O
Molar mass	82.102 g·mol^{−1}
Density	0.98 g·mL^{−1}
Boiling point	150 °C (302 °F; 423 K)
Solubility in water	almost insoluble in water

Hazards
- Occupational safety and health (OHS/OSH)
Main hazards	Harmful
Flash point	42 °C (108 °F; 315 K)
- Except where otherwise noted, data are given for materials in their standard state (at 25 °C [77 °F], 100 kPa). verify (what is ?) Infobox references

2-Cyclopentenone is the organic compound with the chemical formula (CH_{2})_{2}(CH)_{2}CO. 2-Cyclopentenone contains two functional groups, a ketone and an alkene. It is a colorless liquid. Its isomer, 3-cyclopentenone is less commonly encountered.

The term cyclopentenone may also refer to a structural motif wherein the cyclopentenone moiety is a subunit of a larger molecule. Cyclopentenones are found in a large number of natural products, including jasmone, the aflatoxins, and several prostaglandins.

== Synthesis ==
2-Cyclopentenones can be synthesized in a number of ways. One of the routes involves elimination of α-bromo-cyclopentanone using lithium carbonate and Claisen condensation-decarboxylation-isomerization cascades of unsaturated diesters as shown below.

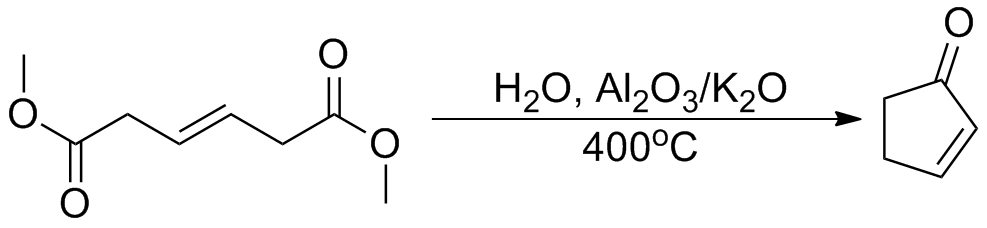
Industrial synthesis of cyclopentenone

The acid-catalyzed dehydration of cyclopentanediols affords cyclopentenone.

As a functional group, the synthesis of 2-cyclopentenones is accomplished in a variety of other ways, including the Nazarov cyclization reaction from divinyl ketones, Saegusa–Ito oxidation from cyclopentanones, ring-closing metathesis from the corresponding dienes, oxidation of the corresponding cyclic allylic alcohols, and the Pauson–Khand reaction from alkenes, alkynes, and carbon monoxide.

== Reactions ==
As an enone, 2-cyclopentenone undergoes the typical reactions of α-β unsaturated ketones, including nucleophilic conjugate addition, the Baylis–Hillman reaction, and the Michael reaction. Cyclopentenone also functions as an excellent dienophile in the Diels–Alder reaction, reacting with a wide variety of dienes. In one example, a Danishefsky-type diene is reacted with a cyclopentenone to yield a fused tricyclic system en route to the synthesis of coriolin.

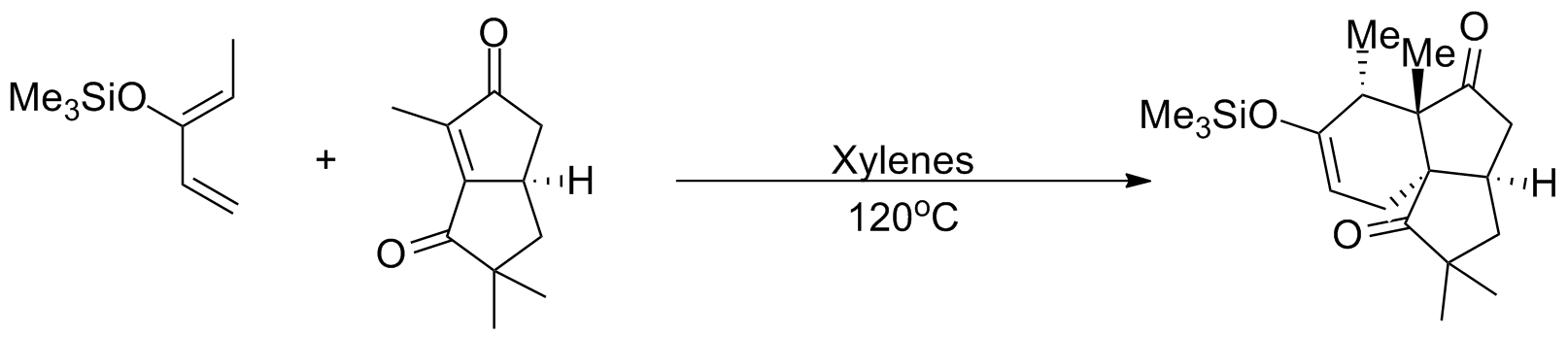
Cyclopentenone in the synthesis of coriolin

== Occurrence ==
It has been isolated from pressure-cooked pork liver by simultaneous steam distillation and continuous solvent extraction.

== Related compounds ==
- cyclopropenone
- cyclobutenone
- cyclohexenone
- cycloheptenone
