= Lionel Salem =

French chemist (1937–2024)

Lionel Salem (5 March 1937 – 29 June 2024) was a French theoretical chemist, former research director at the French National Centre for Scientific Research (CNRS), retired since 1999. He was a member of the International Academy of Quantum Molecular Science which named him its annual award winner in 1975 for his work on photochemical processes and on chemical reaction mechanisms.

He has contributed to the theories of forces between molecules, of conjugated molecules, of organic reaction mechanisms and of heterogeneous catalysis. He developed the electronic theory of diradicals, as well as the concepts of diradical and zwitterionic states. In 1968, he described the energy change for the approach of two molecules as a function of their orbitals' properties; this approach, pursued independently by Gilles Klopman, led to the Klopman–Salem equation and the theory of frontier orbitals.

He is the author of several books on chemical subjects, including The Molecular Orbital Theory of Conjugated Systems (1966), The Organic Chemist's Book of Orbitals (with William L. Jorgensen, 1973), The Marvelous Molecule (1979), and Electrons in Chemical Reactions (1982). Salem died in Paris on 29 June 2024, at the age of 87.
