= DPH =

DPH may refer to:

== Arts ==
- Designated hitter in baseball ("designated pinch hitter")
- Digital planar holography

== Government and law ==
- Georgia Department of Public Health
- Los Angeles County Department of Public Health
- Daň z přidané hodnoty, the Value Added Tax in the Czech Republic
- Daň z pridanej hodnoty, the Value Added Tax in Slovakia

== Health and medicine ==
- Diphenylhydantoin, commonly used antiepileptic; see Phenytoin
- Diphenhydramine, a first generation antihistamine mainly used to treat allergies
- Doctor of Public Health

== Science and engineering ==
- Diamond Pyramid Hardness; see Vickers hardness test
- Daytime parahypnagogia
- Diphenylhexatriene, a fluorescent hydrocarbon used in the study of cell membranes.
- Discrete phase-type distribution in Markov chain theory
- Days post hatching, age after exiting an egg
