= Organocerium chemistry =

Science of specific organometallic compounds

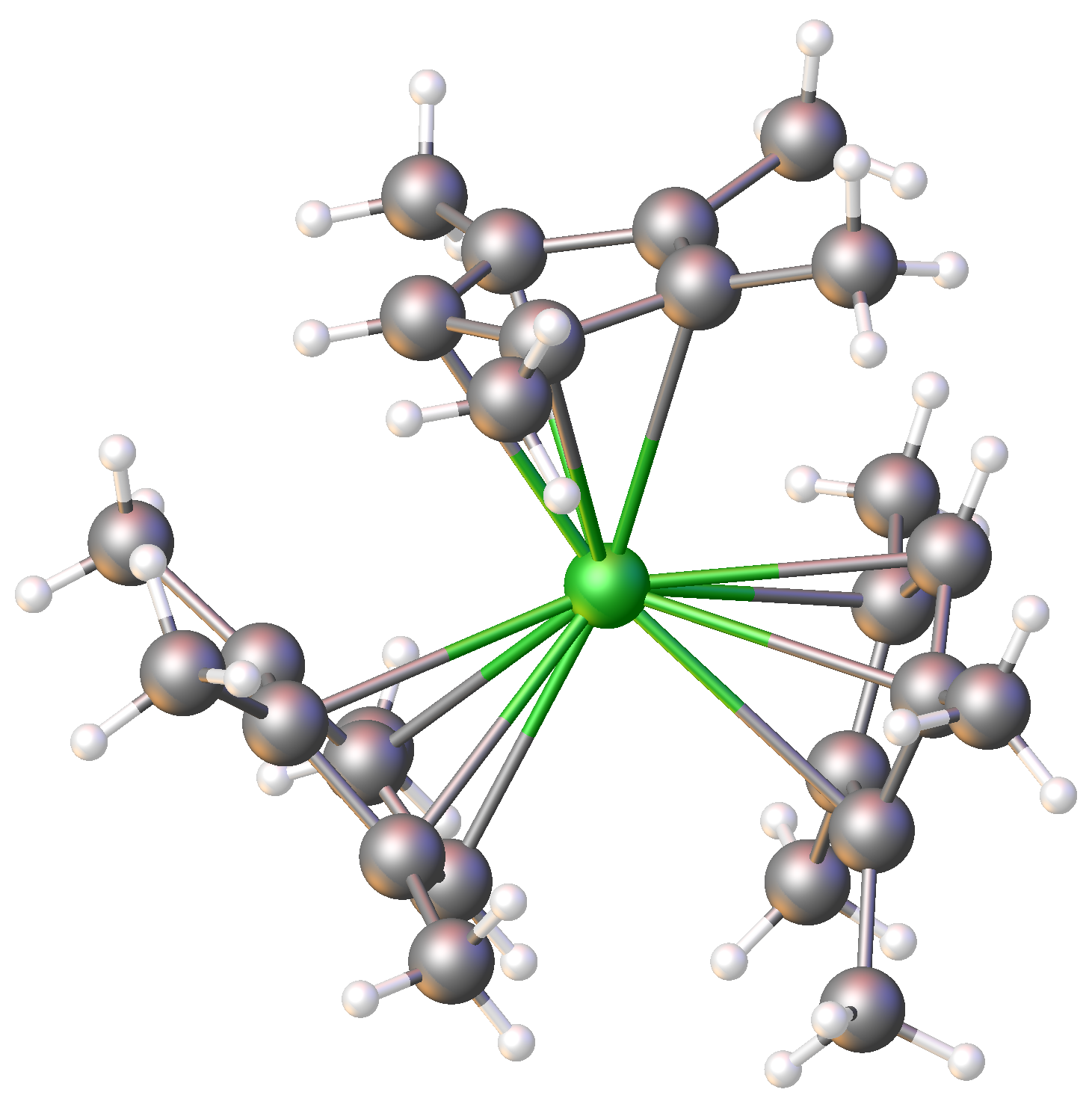
structure of (C_{5}(CH_{3})_{4}H)_{3}Ce. Color code: green = Ce, gray = C, white = H.

Organocerium chemistry is the science of organometallic compounds that contain one or more chemical bond between carbon and cerium. These compounds comprise a subset of the organolanthanides. Most organocerium compounds feature Ce(III) but some Ce(IV) derivatives are known.

== Alkyl derivatives ==
structure of Ce(CH_{3})_{6}[Li(tmeda)]_{3}, where tmeda is (CH_{3})_{2}NCH_{2}CH_{2}N(CH_{3})_{2}

Simple alkylcerium reagents are well known. One example is [Li(tmeda)]_{3}Ce(CH_{3})_{6}.

Although they are described as RCeCl_{2}, their structures are far more complex. Furthermore, the solvent seems to alter the solution structure of the complex, with differences noted between reagents prepared in diethyl ether and tetrahydrofuran. There is evidence that the parent chloride forms a polymeric species in THF solution, of the form [Ce(μ-Cl)_{2}(H_{2}O)(THF)_{2}]_{n}, but whether this type of polymer exists once the organometallic reagent is formed is unknown.

== Cyclopentadienyl derivatives ==
Cyclopentadienyl derivatives of Ce are particularly well characterized. Hundreds have been examined by X-ray crystallography. The depicted (C_{5}(CH_{3})_{4}H)_{3}Ce is one of many.

Some of the best characterized organocerium(IV) compounds feature cyclopentadienyl ligands, e.g. Ce(C_{5}H_{5})_{3}Cl

== Applications to organic synthesis ==
As reagents in organic chemistry, organocerium compounds are typically prepared in situ by treatment of cerium trichloride with organolithium or Grignard reagent. Reagents are derived from alkyl, alkynyl, and alkenyl organometallic reagents as well as enolates have been described. The most common cerium source for this purpose is cerium(III) chloride, which can be obtained in anhydrous form via dehydration of the commercially available heptahydrate. Precomplexation with tetrahydrofuran is important for the success of the transmetallation, with most procedures involving "vigorous stirring for a period of no less than 2 hours". The structures depicted (as below) for organocerium reagent, however are highly simplified.

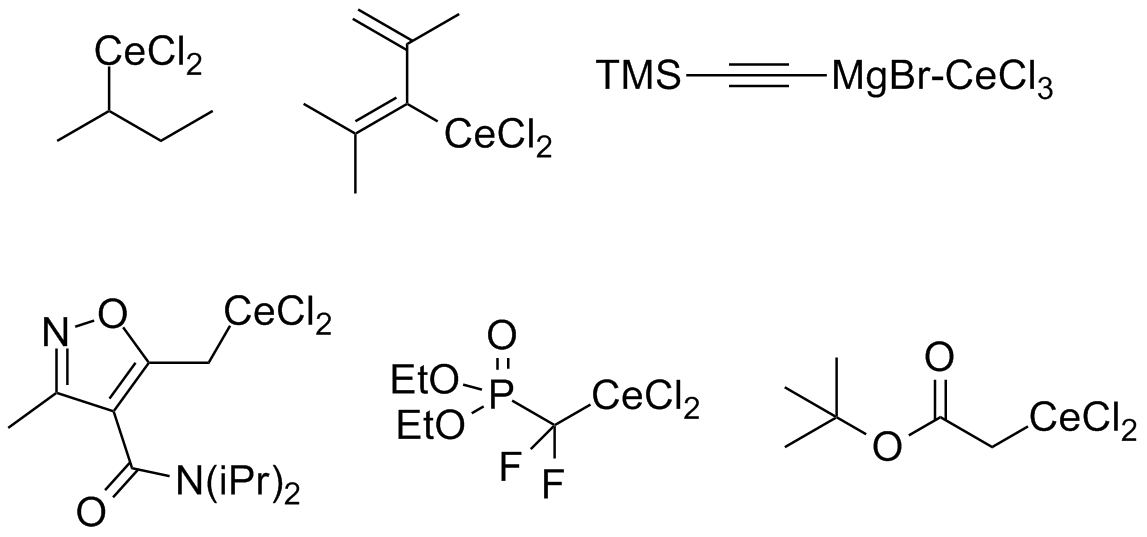
Examples of various organocerium reagents previously reported.

These reagents add 1,2 to conjugated ketones and aldehydes. This preference for direct addition is attributed to the oxophilicity of the cerium reagent, which activates the carbonyl for nucleophilic attack.

== Reactions ==
Organocerium reagents are used almost exclusively for addition reactions in the same vein as organolithium and Grignard reagents.They are highly nucleophilic, allowing additions to imines in the absence of additional Lewis acid catalysts, making them useful for substrates in which typical conditions fail.

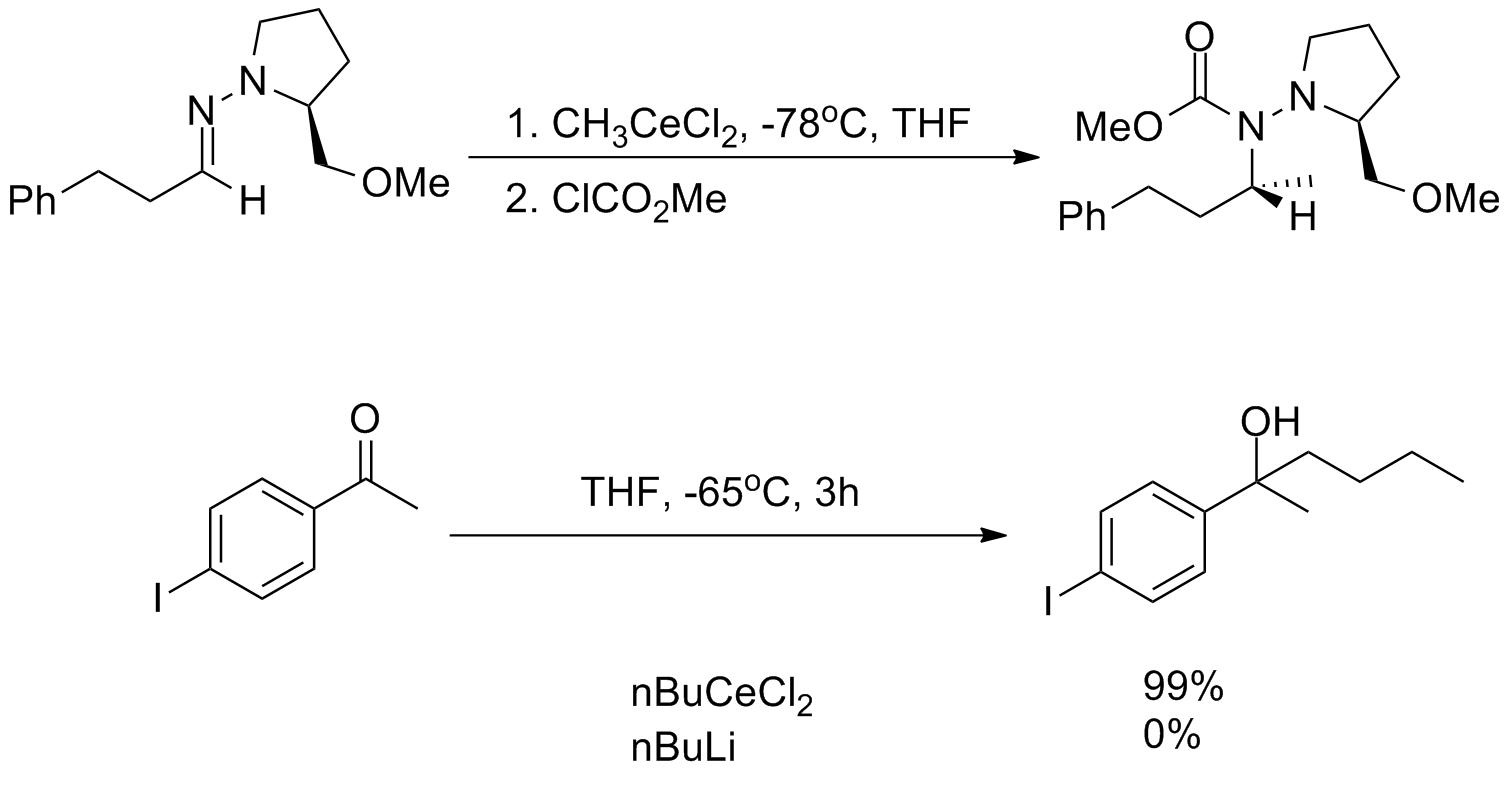
Nucleophilicity of organocerium reagents

Despite this high reactivity, organocerium reagents are almost entirely non-basic, tolerating the presence of free alcohols and amines as well as enolizable α-protons.

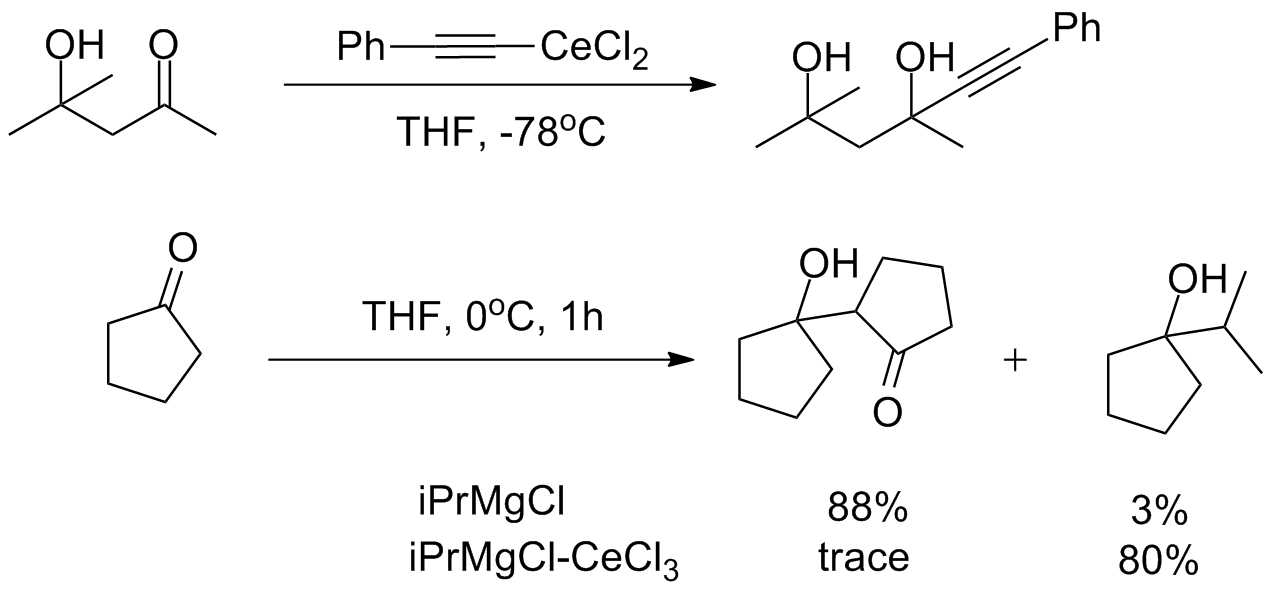
Non-basic tendencies in organocerium reagents

They undergo 1,2-addition in reactions with conjugated electrophiles. At the same time, organocerium reagents can be used to synthesize ketones from acyl compounds without over-addition, as seen with organocuprates.

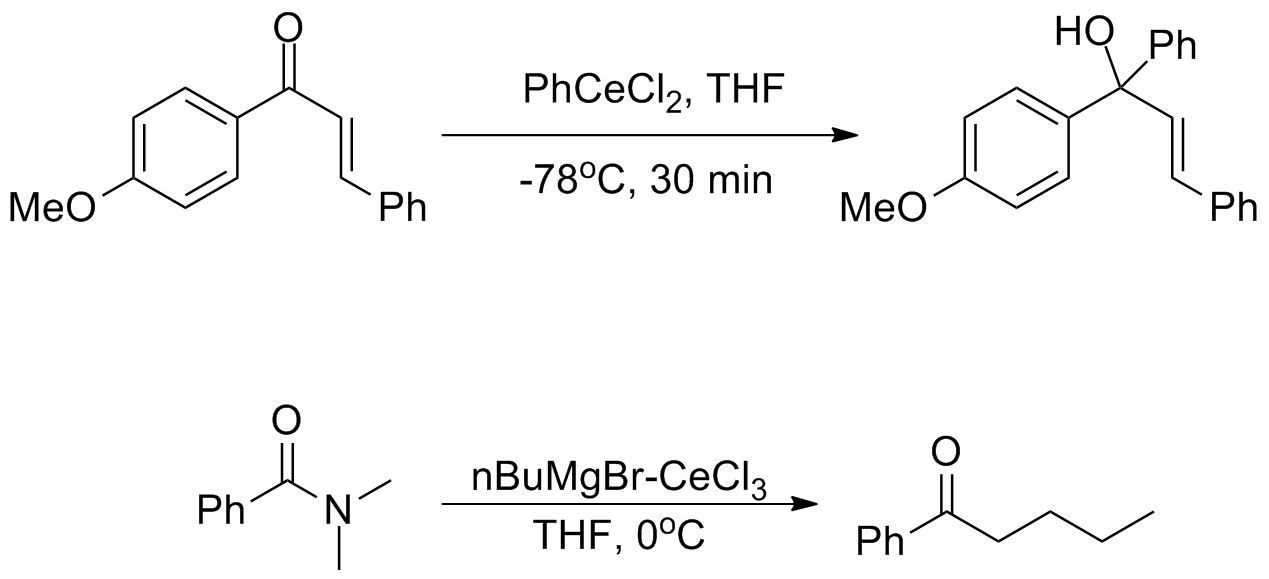
Reactivity and selectivity of organocerium compounds

Organocerium reagents have been employed in a number of total syntheses. Shown below is a key coupling step in the total synthesis of roseophilin, a potent antitumor antibiotic.

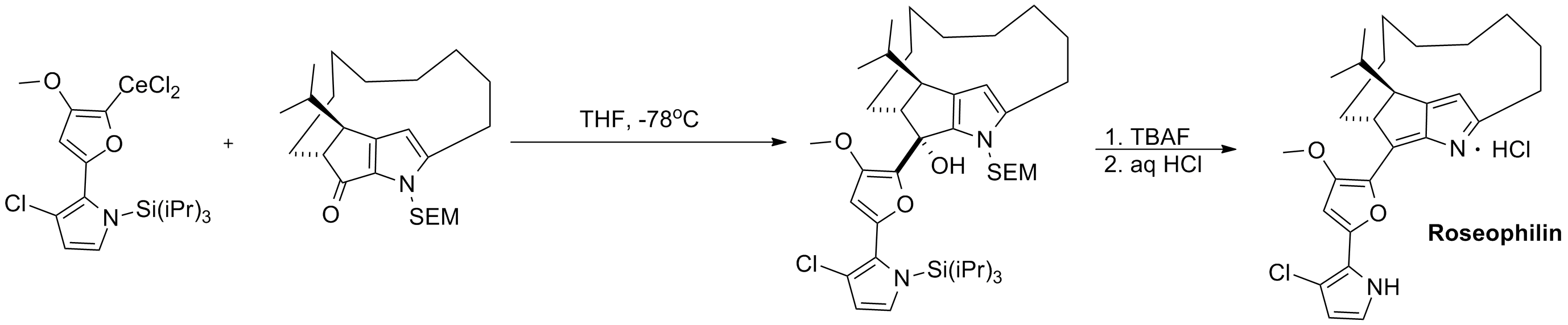
Total synthesis of roseophilin using an organocerium reagent

== See also ==
- Luche reduction
