= Ivan Nazarov =

Soviet chemist (1906–1957)

Ivan Nikolayevich Nazarov (Russian: Иван Николаевич Назаров; 12 June 1906, Koshelevo – 30 July 1957, Avignon) was a Soviet organic chemist.

He started his scientific activities in 1931 at Leningrad State University. Nazarov published more than 300 scientific papers. In 1946, he was elected as a Corresponding Member of the Academy of Sciences of the Soviet Union, and in 1953 he became an academician. The Nazarov cyclization reaction is named after him.
