= Klopman–Salem equation =

In the theory of chemical reactivity, the Klopman–Salem equation describes the energetic change that occurs when two species approach each other in the course of a reaction and begin to interact, as their associated molecular orbitals begin to overlap with each other and atoms bearing partial charges begin to experience attractive or repulsive electrostatic forces. First described independently by Gilles Klopman and Lionel Salem in 1968, this relationship provides a mathematical basis for the key assumptions of frontier molecular orbital theory (i.e., theory of HOMO–LUMO interactions) and hard soft acid base (HSAB) theory. Conceptually, it highlights the importance of considering both electrostatic interactions and orbital interactions (and weighing the relative significance of each) when rationalizing the selectivity or reactivity of a chemical process.

== Formulation and interpretation ==
In modern form, the Klopman–Salem equation is commonly given as:

$\Delta E = \Big(-\sum_{a,b}(q_a+q_b)\beta_{ab}S_{ab}\Big)+\Big(\sum_{k<\ell}\frac{Q_kQ_{\ell}}{\varepsilon R_{k\ell}}\Big)+\Big(\sum_{r}^{\mathrm{occ.}}\sum_{s}^{\mathrm{unocc.}}-\sum_{s}^{\mathrm{occ.}}\sum_{r}^{\mathrm{unocc.}}\frac{2(\sum_{a,b}c_{ra}c_{sb}\beta_{ab})^2}{E_r-E_s}\Big)$,

where:

$q_a$ is the electron population in atomic orbital $a$,

$\beta_{ab}$, $S_{ab}$ are the resonance and overlap integrals for the interaction of atomic orbitals $a$ and $b$,

$Q_k$ is the total charge on atom $k$,

$\varepsilon$ is the local dielectric constant,

$R_{k\ell}$ is the distance between the nuclei of atoms $k$ and $l$,

$c_{ra}$ is the coefficient of atomic orbital $a$ in molecular orbital $r$, and

$E_r$ is the energy of molecular orbital $r$.

Broadly speaking, the first term describes the closed-shell repulsion of the occupied molecular orbitals of the reactants (contribution from four-electron filled–filled interactions, exchange interactions or Pauli repulsion). The second term describes the coulombic attraction or repulsion between the atoms of the reactants (contribution from ionic interactions, electrostatic effects or coulombic interactions). Finally, the third term accounts for all possible interactions between the occupied and unoccupied molecular orbitals of the reactants (contribution from two-electron filled–unfilled interactions, stereoelectronic effects or electron delocalization). Although conceptually useful, the Klopman–Salem equation seldom serves as the basis for energetic analysis in modern quantum chemical calculations.

Because of the difference in MO energies appearing in the denominator of the third term, energetically close orbitals make the biggest contribution. Hence, approximately speaking, analysis can often be simplified by considering only the highest occupied and lowest unoccupied molecular orbitals of the reactants (the HOMO–LUMO interaction in frontier molecular orbital theory). The relative contributions of the second (ionic) and third (covalent) terms play an important role in justifying HSAB theory, with hard–hard interactions governed by the ionic term and soft-soft interactions governed by the covalent term.
