= 1,3,5-Hexatriene =

- trans-1,3,5-hexatriene

Identifiers
CAS Number	2235-12-3 mixture of cis and trans isomers; 821-07-8 E isomer; 2612-46-6 Z isomer
3D model (JSmol)	Interactive image
ECHA InfoCard	100.017.082
EC Number	218-789-7
PubChem CID	145521
UNII	6WCH7CH656
CompTox Dashboard (EPA)	DTXSID3062283
- InChI: InChI=1S/C6H8/c1-3-5-6-4-2/h3,6H,1-2,5H2 Key: KHQKGRVDIZQGHT-UHFFFAOYSA-N
- SMILES: C=CCC=C=C

Properties
Chemical formula	C_{6}H_{8}
Molar mass	80.130 g·mol^{−1}
Appearance	yellow liquid
Boiling point	80–80.5 °C (176.0–176.9 °F; 353.1–353.6 K)
Refractive index (n_{D})	1.5103–1.5119
- Except where otherwise noted, data are given for materials in their standard state (at 25 °C [77 °F], 100 kPa). Infobox references

1,3,5-Hexatriene refers to a pair of organic compounds with the formula CH_{2}=CHCH=CHCH=CH_{2}. The compound is normally obtained as a mixture of cis- and trans-isomers.

== Preparation ==
It can be prepared by several methods, an optimized procedure involves dehydration of 1,5-hexadiene-3-ol, which is obtained from allyl Grignard reagent and acrolein.

The compound has been of theoretical interest, e.g. the Woodward-Hoffmann Rules. 1,3-cyclohexadiene undergoes photoinduced conrotatory ring-opening to give 1,3,5-hexatriene.

== Reactions ==
Protonation of 1,3,5-hexatriene gives the transient methylpentadienyl cation. It undergoes nitration, reminiscent of the behavior of benzene. With maleic anhydride, it undergoes Diels-Alder reaction.

== Related compounds ==
- Diphenylhexatriene
- 1,3,5,7-Octatetraene, a colorless solid, can be prepared by a related procedure involving pentadienal in place of acrolein.
