= Roseophilin =

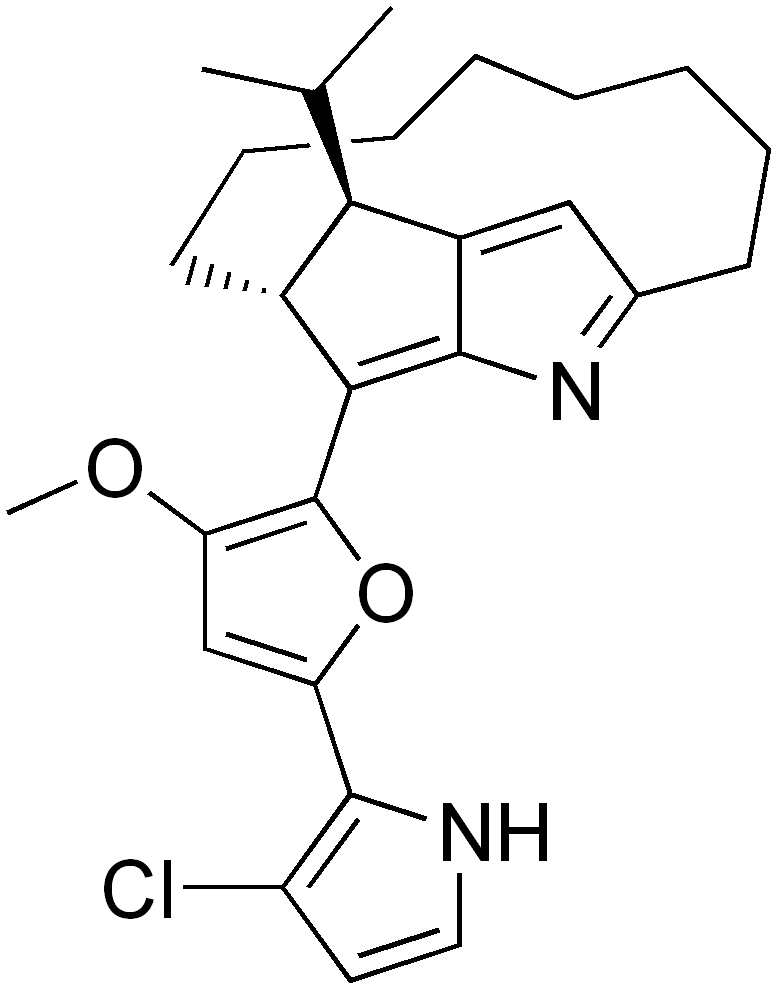

Names
- IUPAC name 15-[5-(3-Chloro-1H-pyrrol-2-yl)-3-methoxy-furan-2-yl]-13-isopropyl-2-aza-tricyclo[10.2.1.13,14]hexadeca-1(15),2-triene

Identifiers
CAS Number	142386-38-7
3D model (JSmol)	Interactive image
ChEMBL	ChEMBL1945189
ChemSpider	4578301
PubChem CID	5467324
CompTox Dashboard (EPA)	DTXSID20745446
- InChI: InChI=1S/C27H33ClN2O2/c1-16(2)23-18-11-9-7-5-4-6-8-10-17-14-19(23)25(30-17)24(18)27-22(31-3)15-21(32-27)26-20(28)12-13-29-26/h12-16,18,23,30H,4-11H2,1-3H3/b26-21-,27-24- Key: XEQIXGXEBJYNMG-OLPWBVPVSA-N; InChI=1/C27H33ClN2O2/c1-16(2)23-18-11-9-7-5-4-6-8-10-17-14-19(23)25(30-17)24(18)27-22(31-3)15-21(32-27)26-20(28)12-13-29-26/h12-16,18,23,30H,4-11H2,1-3H3/b26-21-,27-24- Key: XEQIXGXEBJYNMG-OLPWBVPVBQ
- SMILES: CC(C)[C@H]1[C@@H]\2CCCCCCCCC3=CC1=C(/C2=C\4/C(=C/C(=C/5\C(=CC=N5)Cl)/O4)OC)N3

Properties
Chemical formula	C_{27}H_{33}ClN_{2}O_{2}
Molar mass	453.02 g/mol
- Except where otherwise noted, data are given for materials in their standard state (at 25 °C [77 °F], 100 kPa). verify (what is ?) Infobox references

Roseophilin is an antibiotic isolated from Streptomyces griseoviridis shown to have antitumor activity. The chemical structure can be considered in terms of two components, a macrotricyclic segment and a heterocyclic side-chain. Several laboratory syntheses of roseophilin (e.g., those of Trost, Fürstner, Salamone) are based upon the Paal-Knorr synthesis, and two others are based on the Nazarov cyclization reaction (those of Tius, Frontier). The compound is related to the prodiginines.
