= Diphenylhexatriene =

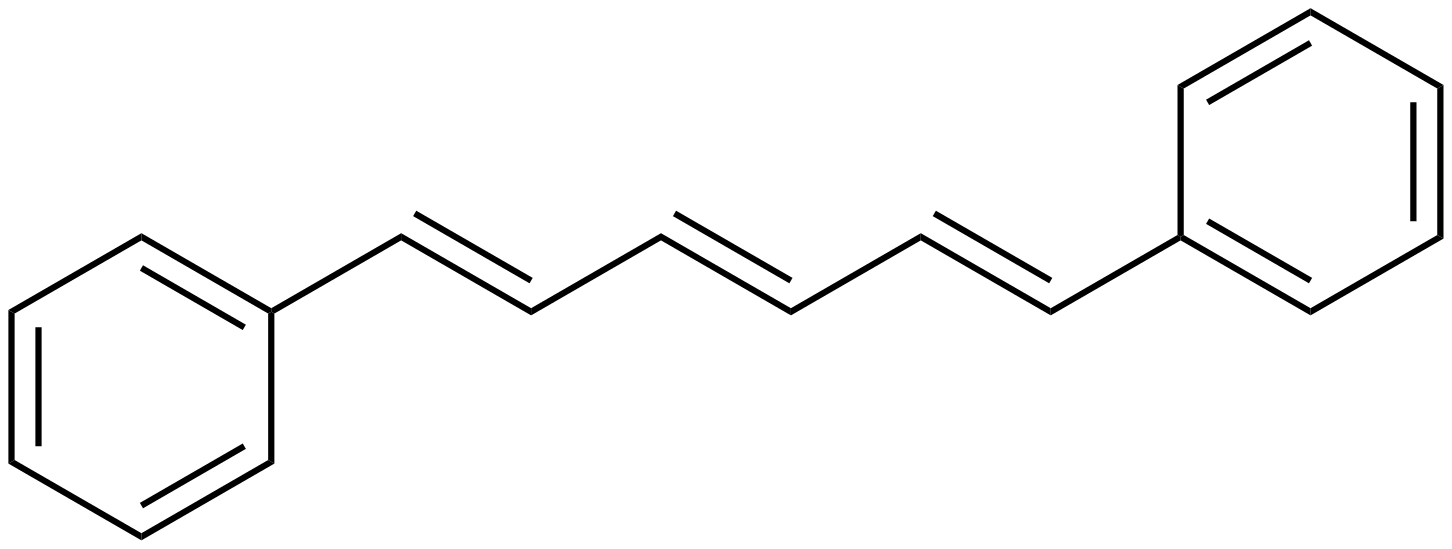

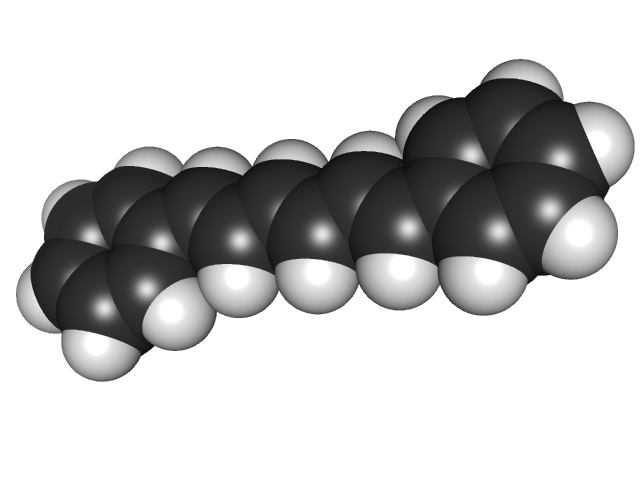

Names
- Preferred IUPAC name 1,1′-[(1E,3E,5E)-Hexa-1,3,5-triene-1,6-diyl]dibenzene
- Other names (1E,3E,5E)-1,6-Diphenylhexa-1,3,5-triene [(1E,3E,5E)-6-Phenylhexa-1,3,5-trien-1-yl]benzene trans,trans,trans-1,6-Diphenylhexatriene; Dicinnamyl

Identifiers
| CAS Number | 17329-15-6 |
| 3D model (JSmol) | Interactive image |
| ChEBI | CHEBI:51594 |
| ChemSpider | 4525932 |
| ECHA InfoCard | 100.015.465 |
| EC Number | 217-011-3 |
| PubChem CID | 5376733 |
| UNII | Z428QK7RTE |
| CompTox Dashboard (EPA) | DTXSID401336583 DTXSID9061912, DTXSID401336583 |
- InChI: InChI=1S/C18H16/c1(5-11-17-13-7-3-8-14-17)2-6-12-18-15-9-4-10-16-18/h1-16H/b2-1+,11-5+,12-6+ Key: BOBLSBAZCVBABY-WPWUJOAOSA-N
- SMILES: C1=CC=C(C=C1)/C=C/C=C/C=C/C2=CC=CC=C2

Properties
| Chemical formula | C_{18}H_{16} |
| Molar mass | 232.326 g·mol^{−1} |
| Melting point | 199 to 203 °C (390 to 397 °F; 472 to 476 K) |
| Magnetic susceptibility (χ) | −146.9·10^{−6} cm^{3}/mol |

Hazards
- GHS labelling
| Pictograms | (GHS07: Exclamation mark) |
| Signal word | Warning |
| Hazard statements | H315, H319, H335 |
| Precautionary statements | P261, P264, P271, P280, P302+P352, P304+P340, P305+P351+P338, P312, P332+P313, P337+P313, P362, P403+P233, P405, P501 |
- Except where otherwise noted, data are given for materials in their standard state (at 25 °C [77 °F], 100 kPa). verify (what is ?) Infobox references

Diphenylhexatriene is a fluorescent hydrocarbon used in the study of cell membranes. It is almost non-fluorescent in water, but it exhibits strong fluorescence when it is intercalated into lipid membranes. It incorporates itself into the lipid bilayer and acts like a lipid.

== Related compounds ==
- 1,3,5-Hexatriene
