= Koshelevo =

Koshelevo Кошелево
- Village
- Location within Vladimir Oblast Location within Russia
- Coordinates: 56°03′N 39°06′E
- Country: Russia
- Region: Vladimir Oblast
- District: Kirzhachsky District
- Time zone: UTC+3:00

Koshelevo (Russian: Кошелево) is a rural locality (a village) in Kiprevskoye Rural Settlement, Kirzhachsky District, Vladimir Oblast, Russia. The population was 1 as of 2010. There is 1 street.

== Geography ==
Koshelevo is located 22 km southeast of Kirzhach (the district's administrative centre) by road. Novosyolovo is the nearest rural locality.
