= Cycloocta-1,3,6-triene =

- Skeletal formula of cycloocta-1,3,6-triene ((1Z,3Z,6Z)-1,3,6-triene)

Names
- Systematic IUPAC name Cycloocta-1,3,6-triene

Identifiers
CAS Number	3725-30-2 (1Z,3Z,6Z)-
3D model (JSmol)	Interactive image
Beilstein Reference	1848165
ChEBI	CHEBI:37892
ChemSpider	4518805 (1Z,3Z,6Z)-1,3,6-triene
Gmelin Reference	260126
PubChem CID	34696; 5367250 (1Z,3Z,6Z)
UNII	A4MP3YY9QN
- InChI: InChI=1S/C8H10/c1-2-4-6-8-7-5-3-1/h1-4,7-8H,5-6H2/b3-1-,4-2-,8-7- Key: LHNSMWDERKGLJK-DKPWQKSPSA-N
- SMILES: C1C=CCC=CC=C1

Properties
Chemical formula	C_{8}H_{10}
Molar mass	106.168 g·mol^{−1}
Melting point	−59 °C; −74 °F; 214 K
Boiling point	68 °C; 154 °F; 341 K at 8.0 kPa
- Except where otherwise noted, data are given for materials in their standard state (at 25 °C [77 °F], 100 kPa). Infobox references

Cycloocta-1,3,6-triene is an organic chemical compound related to cyclooctatetraene. It is an example of a cycloalkene which exhibits geometric isomerism. It is sometimes used in synthesizing cyclooctatetraene.
