= Jasmone =

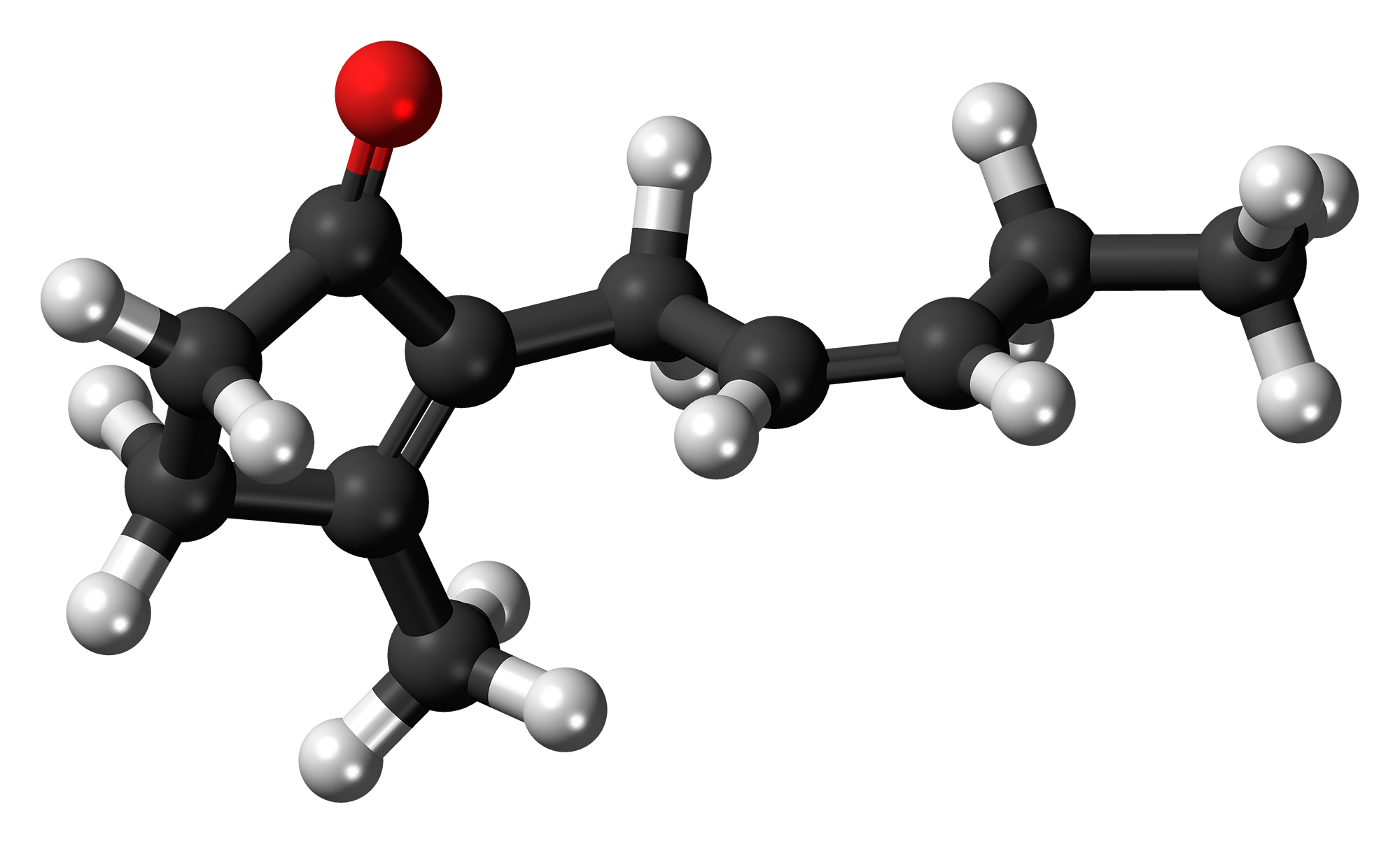

Names
- Preferred IUPAC name 3-methyl-2-[(2Z)-pent-2-en-1-yl]cyclopent-2-en-1-one
- Other names cis-Jasmone

Identifiers
CAS Number	488-10-8
3D model (JSmol)	Interactive image; Interactive image
ChemSpider	1266012
PubChem CID	1549018
UNII	RC4W0G9YUK
- InChI: InChI=1S/C11H16O/c1-3-4-5-6-10-9(2)7-8-11(10)12/h4-5H,3,6-8H2,1-2H3/b5-4- Key: XMLSXPIVAXONDL-PLNGDYQASA-N
- SMILES: CC\C=C/CC1=C(CCC1=O)C; O=C1\C(=C(/CC1)C)C\C=C/CC

Properties
Chemical formula	C_{11}H_{16}O
Molar mass	164.246 g/mol
Appearance	colorless to pale yellow liquid
Density	0.94 g/mL, liquid
Melting point	203 to 205 °C (397 to 401 °F; 476 to 478 K)
Boiling point	146 °C (295 °F; 419 K) at 27 mmHg
Solubility in water	in water
- Except where otherwise noted, data are given for materials in their standard state (at 25 °C [77 °F], 100 kPa). verify (what is ?) Infobox references

Jasmone is an organic compound, which is a volatile portion of the oil from jasmine flowers. It is a colorless to pale yellow liquid. Jasmone can exist in two isomeric forms with differing geometry around the pentenyl double bond, cis-jasmone and trans-jasmone. The natural extract contains only the cis form, while synthetic material is often a mixture of both, with the cis form predominating. Both forms have similar odors and chemical properties. Its structure was deduced by Lavoslav Ružička.

Jasmone is produced by some plants by the metabolism of jasmonic acid, via a decarboxylation. It can act as either an attractant or a repellent for various insects. Commercially, jasmone is used primarily in perfumes and cosmetics. In perfume compositions, jasmone is used in small concentrations, where it enhances the naturalness of floral notes.
