= Octatetraene =

- Structure of the trans-isomer of octatetraene

Names
- IUPAC name (E,E)-1,3,5,7-Octatetraene

Identifiers
CAS Number	E,E: 3725-31-3; 1482-91-3 (non-specific)
3D model (JSmol)	Interactive image
ChemSpider	4575894
PubChem CID	5463164
UNII	AAR9LNJ92M
- InChI: InChI=1S/C8H10/c1-3-5-7-8-6-4-2/h3-8H,1-2H2/b7-5+,8-6+ Key: VXQUABLSXKFKLO-KQQUZDAGSA-N
- SMILES: C=C/C=C/C=C/C=C

Properties
Chemical formula	C_{8}H_{10}
Molar mass	106.168 g·mol^{−1}
Appearance	Colorless liquid

Related compounds
- Except where otherwise noted, data are given for materials in their standard state (at 25 °C [77 °F], 100 kPa). Infobox references

Octatetraene is a linear hydrocarbon consisting of a chain of eight carbon atoms linked by an alternating double-bond/single-bond pattern. The central two of the four alkene units can exhibit cis–trans isomerism, resulting in three isomers.

The compounds are not in general of much commercial significance, but the octatetraene group has been studied in contexts in the physical chemistry of bonds, some aspect of which have relevance to cell membranes and some to the retinal chemistry of vision. The high degrees of symmetries and conjugation of bonds offer unusual aspects for study.

Related structures occur in some molecules of biological importance, for example α-parinaric acid and polyunsaturated fatty acids. Derivatives include cyclic octatetraenes, such as cyclooctatetraene and 1,8-diphenyl-1,3,5,7-octatraene, some of which are of interest in special contexts.
