= C12H11N =

The molecular formula C_{12}H_{11}N (molar mass: 169.22 g/mol) may refer to:

- Aminobiphenyls
  - 2-Aminobiphenyl (2-APB)
  - 3-Aminobiphenyl
  - 4-Aminobiphenyl (4-APB)
- Diphenylamine
