= Palladium(II) acetate =

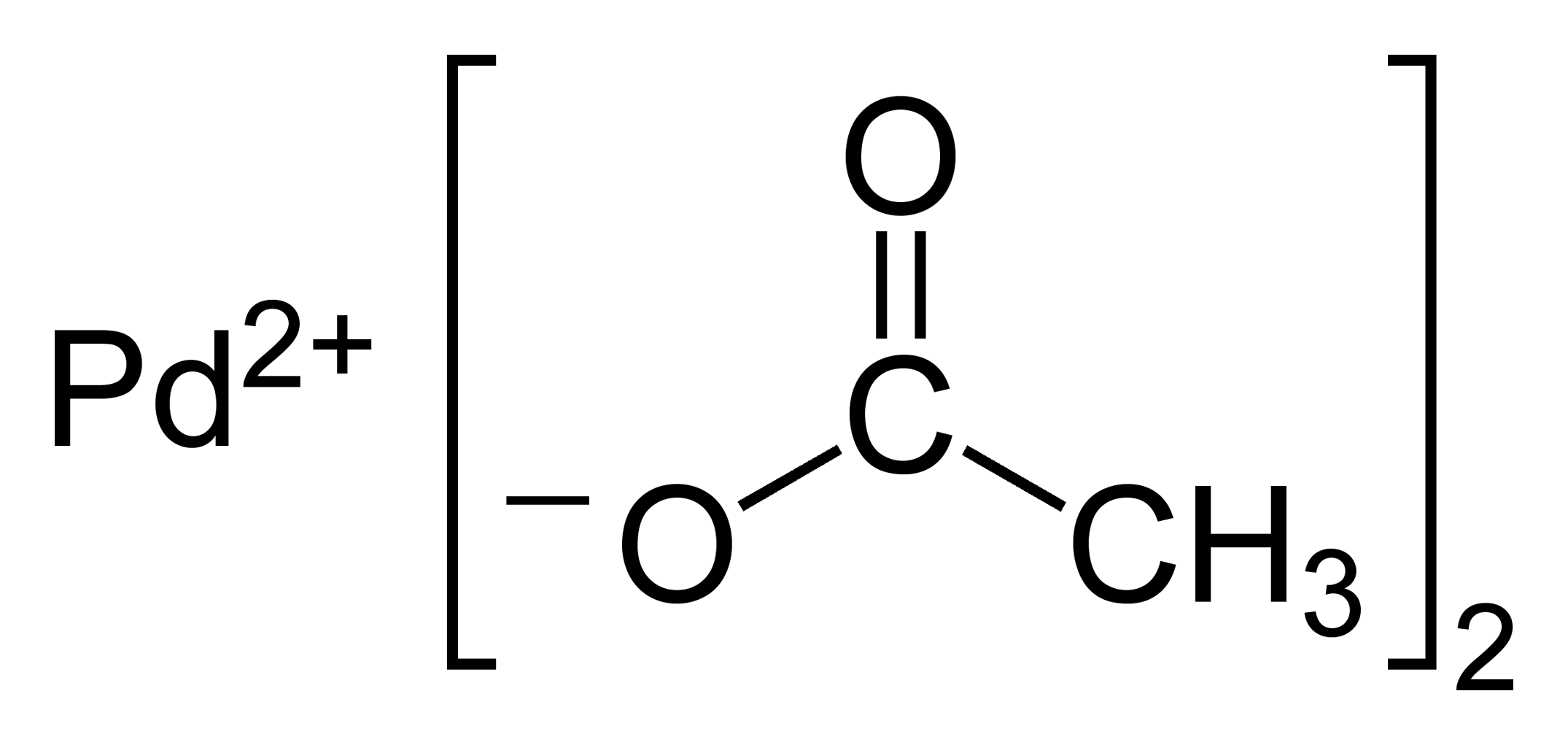

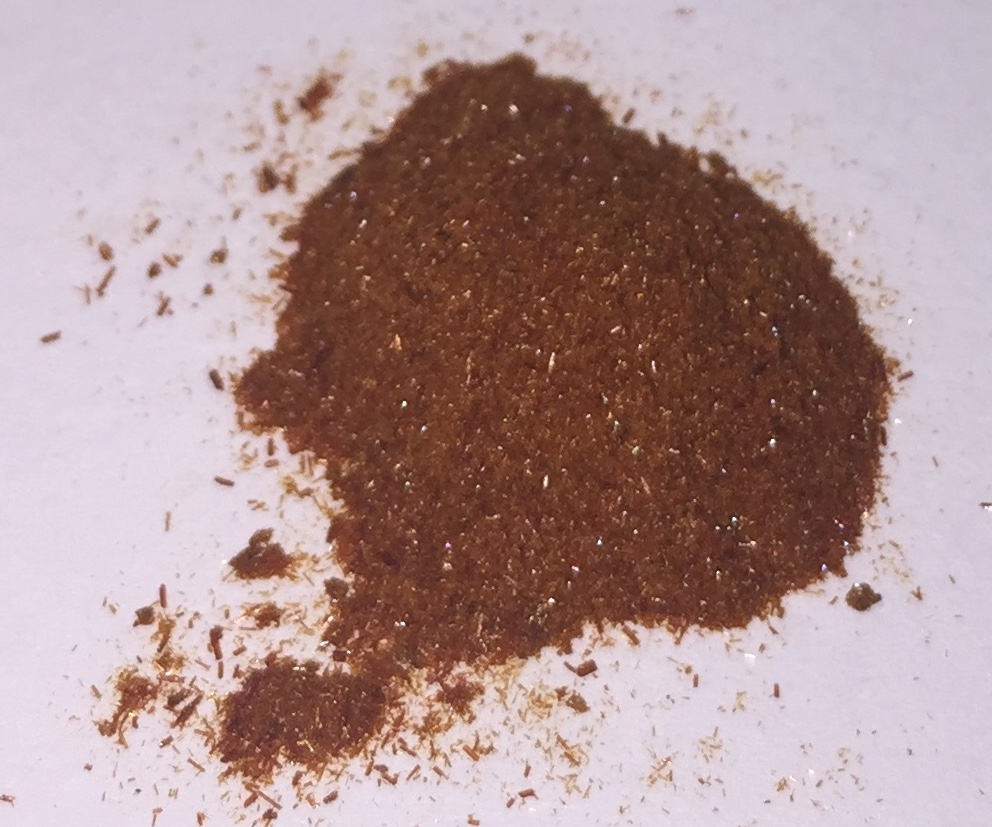

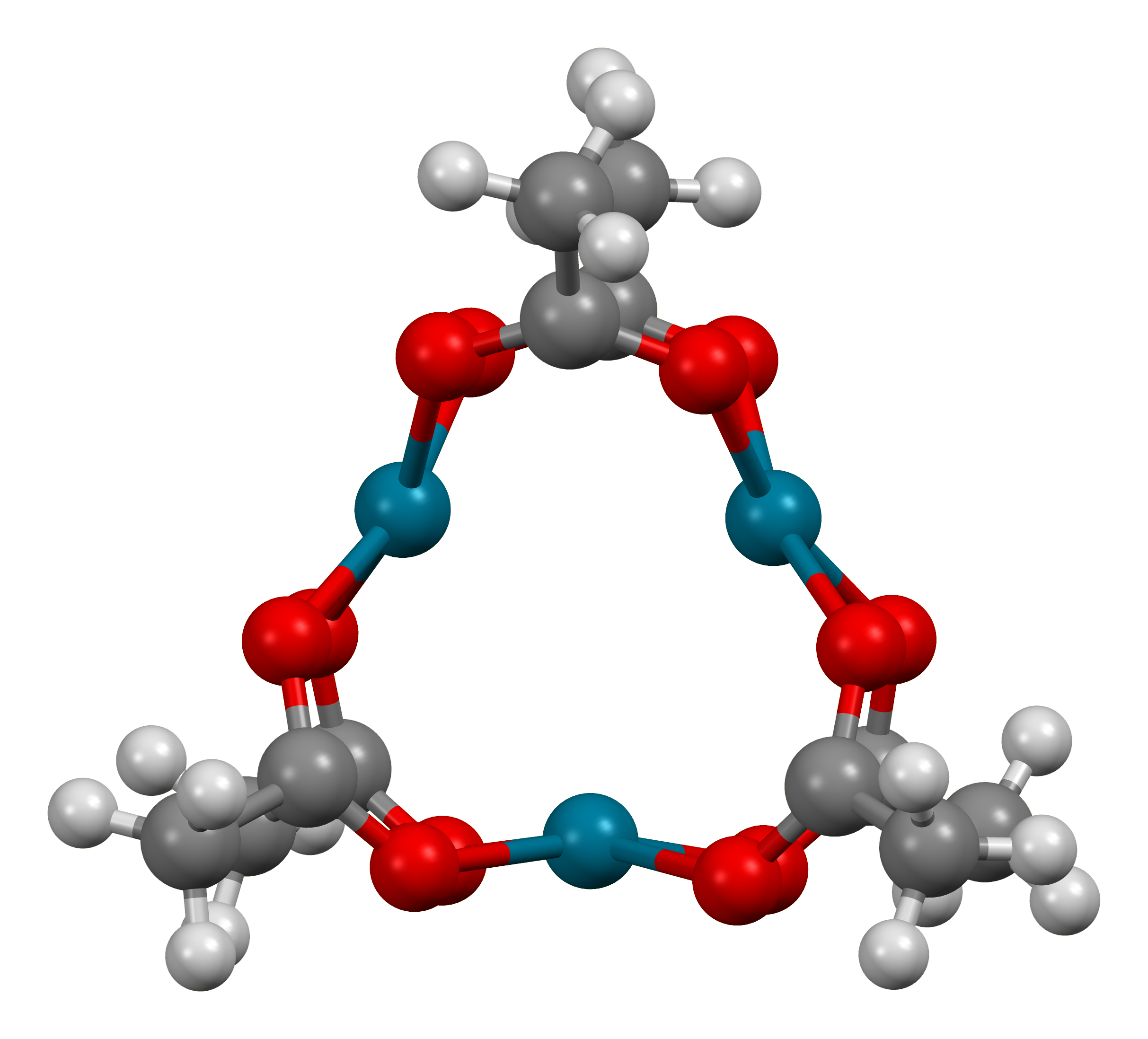

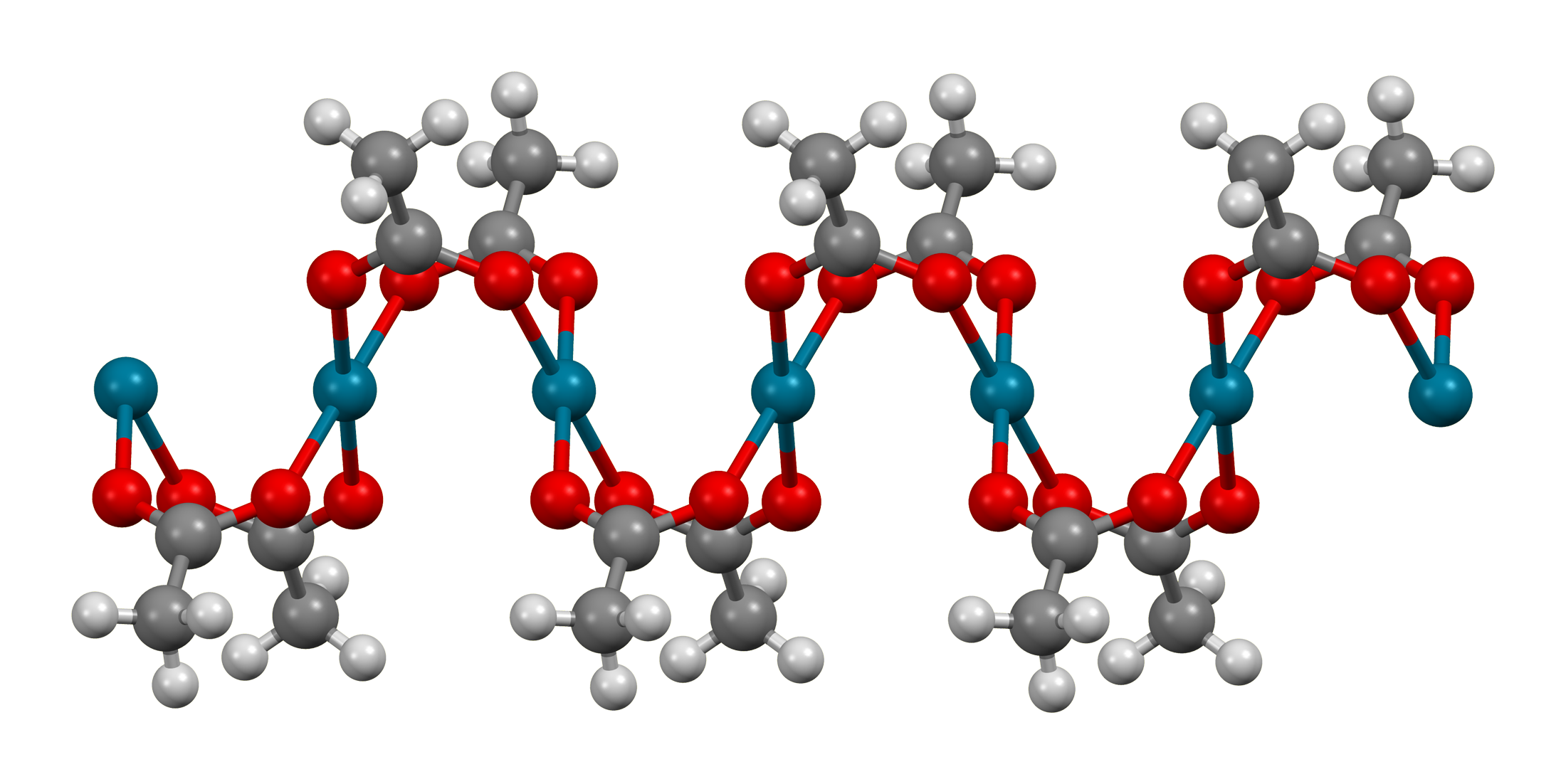

Names
- IUPAC name Palladium(II) acetate
- Other names Palladium diacetate hexakis(acetato)tripalladium bis(acetato)palladium

Identifiers
| CAS Number | 3375-31-3 |
| 3D model (JSmol) | ionic form: Interactive image; coordination form (cyclic trimer): Interactive image |
| ChemSpider | 146827 |
| ECHA InfoCard | 100.020.151 |
| EC Number | 222-164-4 |
| PubChem CID | 167845 |
| RTECS number | AJ1900000 |
| UNII | 0LTG3460Y5 |
| CompTox Dashboard (EPA) | DTXSID10890575 |
- InChI: InChI=1S/2C2H4O2.Pd/c2*1-2(3)4;/h2*1H3,(H,3,4);/q;;+2/p-2 Key: YJVFFLUZDVXJQI-UHFFFAOYSA-L; InChI=1/2C2H4O2.Pd/c2*1-2(3)4;/h2*1H3,(H,3,4);/q;;+2/p-2 Key: YJVFFLUZDVXJQI-NUQVWONBAH
- SMILES: ionic form: [Pd+2].[O-]C(=O)C.[O-]C(=O)C; coordination form (cyclic trimer): O0[C-](C)O[Pd+2]3(O[C-](C)O1)O[C-](C)O[Pd+2]1(O[C-](C)O2)O[C-](C)O[Pd-2]02O[C-](C)O3

Properties
| Chemical formula | Pd(CH_{3}COO)_{2} |
| Molar mass | 224.51 g/mol |
| Appearance | Brown yellow solid |
| Density | 2.19 g/cm^{3} |
| Melting point | 205 °C (401 °F; 478 K) decomposes |
| Solubility in water | low |

Structure
| Crystal structure | monoclinic |
| Coordination geometry | square planar |
| Dipole moment | 0 D |

Hazards
- Occupational safety and health (OHS/OSH)
| Main hazards | considered nonhazardous |
- GHS labelling
| Pictograms | (GHS05: Corrosive) (GHS07: Exclamation mark) (GHS09: Environmental hazard) |
| Signal word | Danger |
| Hazard statements | H317, H318, H410 |
| Precautionary statements | P261, P272, P273, P280, P302+P352, P305+P351+P338 |
- Safety data sheet (SDS)

Related compounds
| Other anions | Palladium(II) chloride |
| Other cations | Platinum(II) acetate |
- Except where otherwise noted, data are given for materials in their standard state (at 25 °C [77 °F], 100 kPa). verify (what is ?) Infobox references

Palladium(II) acetate is a chemical compound of palladium described by the formula [Pd(O_{2}CCH_{3})_{2}]_{n}, abbreviated [Pd(OAc)_{2}]_{n}. It is more reactive than the analogous platinum compound. Depending on the value of n, the compound is soluble in many organic solvents and is commonly used as a catalyst for organic reactions.

== Structure ==
With a 1:2 stoichiometric ratio of palladium atoms and acetate ligands, the compound exists as molecular and polymeric forms with the trimeric form being the dominant form in the solid state and in solution. Pd achieves approximate square planar coordination in both forms.

As prepared by Geoffrey Wilkinson and coworkers in 1965 and later characterized by Skapski and Smart in 1970 by single crystal X-ray diffraction, palladium(II) acetate is a red-brown solid that crystallizes as monoclinic plates. It has a trimeric structure, consisting of an equilateral triangle of Pd atoms each pair of which is bridged with two acetate groups in a butterfly conformation.

Palladium(II) acetate can also be prepared as a pale pink form. According to X-ray powder diffraction, this form is polymeric.

== Preparation ==
Palladium acetate, in trimeric form, can be prepared by treating palladium sponge with a mixture of acetic acid and nitric acid. An excess of palladium sponge metal or nitrogen gas flow are required to prevent contamination by the mixed nitrito-acetate (Pd_{3}(OAc)_{5}NO_{2}).

Pd + 4 HNO_{3} → Pd(NO_{3})_{2} + 2 NO_{2} + 2 H_{2}O
Pd(NO_{3})_{2} + 2 CH_{3}COOH → Pd(O_{2}CCH_{3})_{2} + 2 HNO_{3}

Relative to the trimeric acetate, the mixed nitrate-acetate variant has different solubility and catalytic activity. Preventing, or controlling for the amount of, this impurity can be an important aspect for reliable use of palladium(II) acetate.

Palladium(II) propionate is prepared analogously; other carboxylates are prepared by treating palladium(II) acetate with the appropriate carboxylic acid. Likewise, palladium(II) acetate can be prepared by treating other palladium(II) carboxylates with acetic acid. This ligand exchange starting with a purified other carboxylate is an alternative way to synthesize palladium(II) acetate free from the nitro contaminant.

Palladium(II) acetate is prone to reduction to Pd(0) in the presence of reagents which can undergo beta-hydride elimination such as primary and secondary alcohols as well as amines. When warmed with alcohols, or on prolonged boiling with other solvents, palladium(II) acetate decomposes to palladium.

== Catalysis ==
Palladium acetate is a catalyst for many organic reactions, especially alkenes, dienes, and alkyl, aryl, and vinyl halides to form reactive adducts.

Reactions catalyzed by palladium(II) acetate:

- Vinylation: An example is the Heck reaction and related processes.
- Rearrangement of acyclic dienes: An example is the Cope rearrangement
- Carbonylation reactions: for example, the formation of esters from aryl iodides, carbon monoxide, an alcohol or phenol.
- Reductive amination of aldehydes or ketones by potassium formate.
- Wacker process: the oxidation of ethylene by water to acetaldehyde (precursor to poly(vinyl acetate).
- Buchwald-Hartwig amination of aryl halides/pseudohalides with alkyl an aryl amines.
- conversion of aryl bromides into the trimethylsilanes, a functional group in many organic compounds including the fungicide "Latitude".

RC_{6}H_{4}Br + Si_{2}(CH_{3})_{6} → RC_{6}H_{4}Si(CH_{3})_{3} + Si(CH_{3})_{3}Br

Pd(O_{2}CCH_{3})_{2} is compatible with the electronic properties of aryl bromides, and unlike other methods of synthesis, this method does not require high pressure equipment.

== Precursor to other Pd compounds ==
Palladium acetate is used to produce other palladium(II) compounds. For example, phenylpalladium acetate, used to isomerize allyl alcohols to aldehydes, is prepared by the following reaction:

Hg(C_{6}H_{5})(OAc) + Pd(OAc)_{2} → Pd(C_{6}H_{5})(OAc) + Hg(OAc)_{2}

Palladium(II) acetate reacts with acetylacetone (the "acac" ligand) to produce Pd(acac)_{2}.

Herrmann's catalyst is made by reaction of palladium(II) acetate with tris(o-tolyl)phosphine.

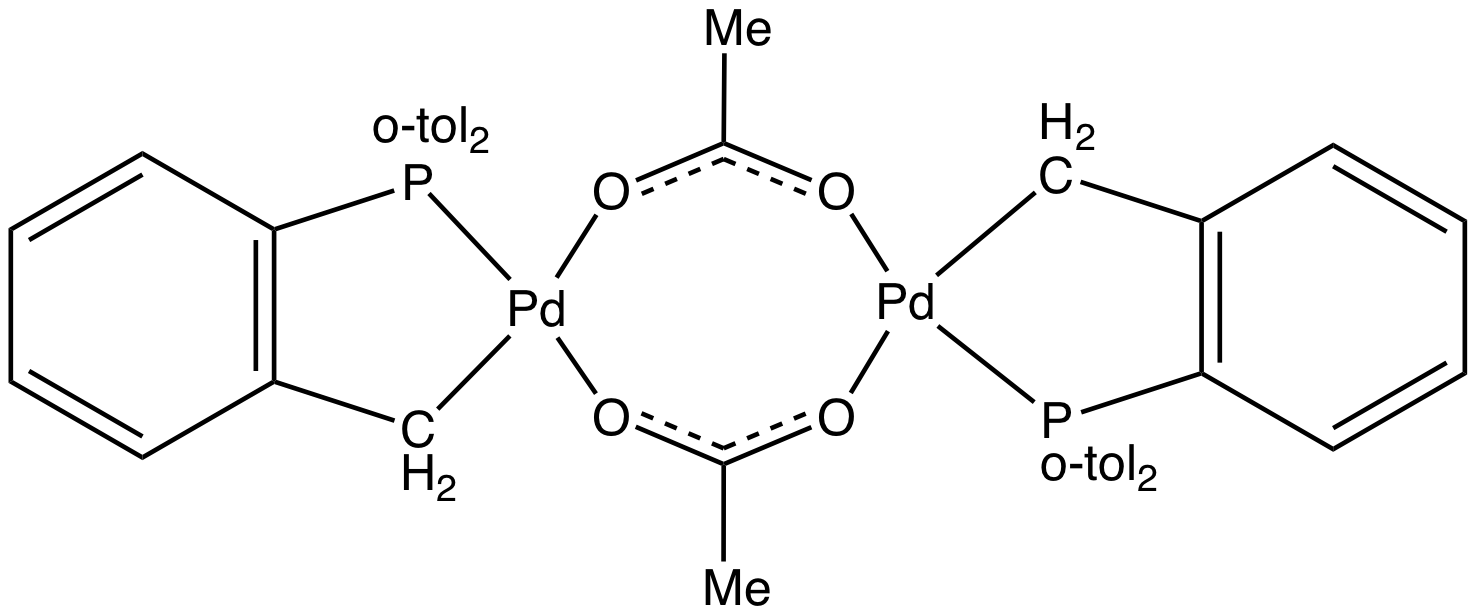
Structure of Herrmann's catalyst.

Light or heat reduce palladium acetate to give thin layers of palladium and can produce nanowires and colloids.

== See also ==
- Saegusa–Ito oxidation
