= Palladacycle =

Palladacycle, as a class of metallacycles, refers to complexes containing at least one carbon-palladium bond. Palladacycles are invoked as intermediates in catalytic or palladium mediated reactions. They have been investigated as pre-catalysts for homogeneous catalysis and synthesis.

== History ==
In the 1960s, Arthur C. Cope and Robert W. Siekman reported on the reaction between azobenzene and palladium(II) dichloride. The potential of palladacycles as catalysts was highlighted by the invention of Herrmann's catalyst in the 1990s, as derivatives of tris(o-tolyl)phosphine proved effective in Heck reactions.

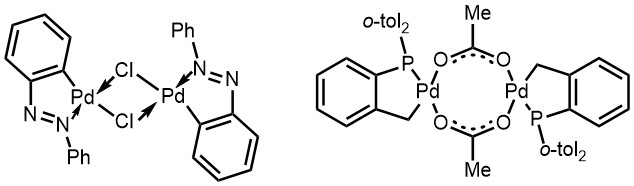
Chemical structures of the first palladacycle ever reported (left) and Herrmann’s catalyst (right).

== Classes of palladacycles ==
There are two distinct types of palladacycle: four-electron donor (CY) and six-electron donor (YCY) complexes.

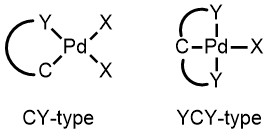
CY-/YCY-type palladacycles

=== Neutral, cationic and anionic palladacycles ===
The palladacycles can be neutral, cationic, or anionic. Depending on the nature of the coordinating ligands, the neutral palladacycles can be monomers, dimers, or bis-cyclopalladated.

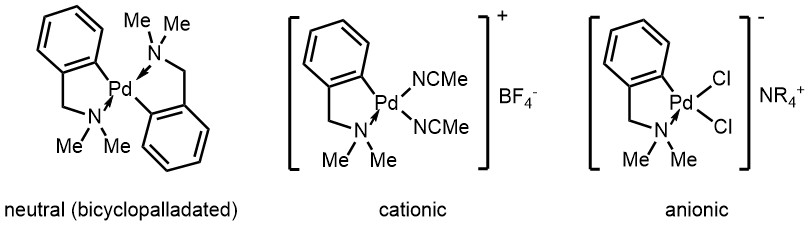
Examples of neutral, cationic and anionic palladacycles.

=== Palladacycles with various ring-sizes ===
Palladacycles with ring-sizes range from 3 to 10 have been synthesized and characterized, whereas only 5-/6-membered ones are commonly used. Palladacycles of 3-/4-/>6-membered ring-sizes are usually unstable due to their ring strains.

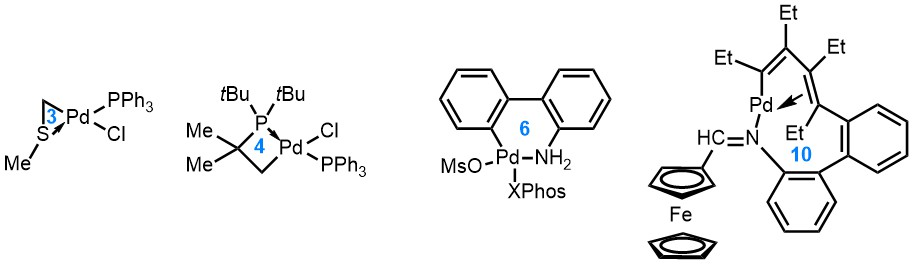
Examples of palladacycles with various ring-sizes

=== Palladacycles with various donor groups ===
The palladacycles could also be classified by the donor atoms. For example, the Herrmann’s catalyst discussed before is a phosphine-derived palladacycle. Other types of palladacycles such as phosphite palladacycle, imine palladacycle, oxime palladacycle, CS-/CO-palladacycles are also effective in catalytic reactions. Palladacycles derived from 2-aminobiphenyl have been used in a variety of cross-coupling reactions.

== Synthesis of palladacycles ==
Several methods are available for the preparation of palladacycles. A simple and direct method is C–H activation. The cyclopalladation of aromatic derivatives is usually considered to go through an electrophilic aromatic substitution pathway. The oxidative addition of aryl halides is another useful method. However, the accessibility of the aryl halides starting material is a major drawback.

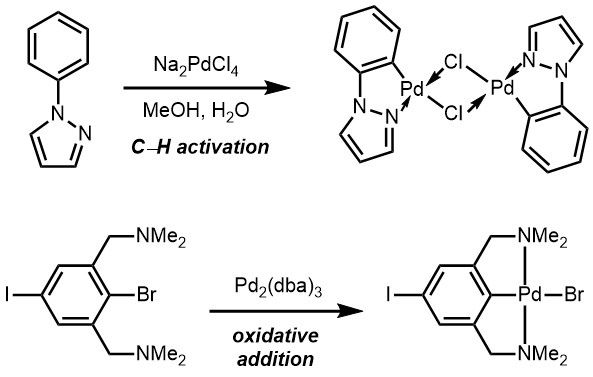
Preparation of palladacycles via C-H activation and oxidative addition.

Other types of reactions such as transmetalation and nucleopalladation also turned out to be effective methods in the synthesis of palladacycles.

== Applications as precatalysts ==
Palladacycles are used as pre-catalysts, usually by the reductive elimination from palladium(II) to the catalytically active palladium(0). In the example of 2-aminobiphenyl palladacycles, a kinetically active 12-electrons Pd(0) species is formed, allowing for further oxidative addition with reactants. A series of 2-aminobiphenyl bearing various X and L groups were synthesized to better understand the electron/steric effect.

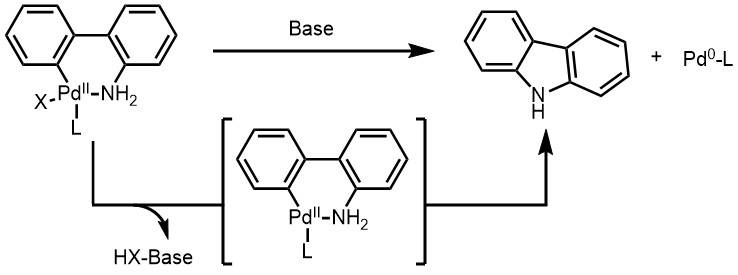
Activation of Buchwald palladacycle pre-catalysts.

By employing palladacycles as pre-catalysts, high reactivity and selectivity have been achieved in Heck reaction[2] and a variety of cross-coupling reactions, such as Suzuki, Sonogashira, Stille, Buchwald–Hartwig reactions.

Total synthesis containing palladacycles have been demonstrated.

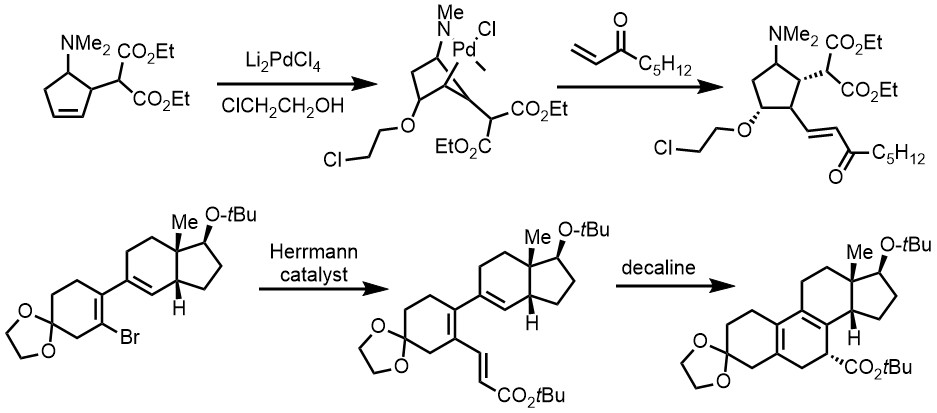
Palladacycles as intermediate and pre-catalyst in total synthesis

== Other applications ==
Except their abilities in catalyzing organic reactions, palladacycles have also shown their potential in medicinal and biological chemistry after the success of cis-Pt(NH_{3})_{2}Cl_{2} as an anticancer agent. Additionally, they can also be used in CO/SCN- sensing.
