= Hanoch Senderowitz =

Israeli chemist

- חנוך סנדרוביץ
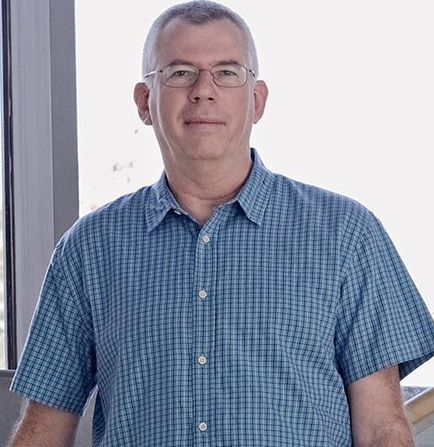
- Born: 1963 (age 62–63); Tel Aviv, Israel
- Citizenship: Israeli
- Education: Tel Aviv University
- Scientific career
- Fields: Computational Chemistry, Molecular modelling, Computer-Aided Drug Design, Chemoinformatics, Materials informatics
- Workplaces: Bar-Ilan University
- Doctoral advisor: Benzion Fuchs
- Other academic advisors: W. Clark Still (Columbia University)

Hanoch Senderowitz (Hebrew: חנוך סנדרוביץ; born 1963) is an Israeli chemist specializing in the fields of Computational Chemistry, Molecular modelling, Computer-Aided Drug Design, and Chemoinformatics.

== Biography ==
Hanoch Senderowitz received his Ph.D. in 1993 from Tel Aviv University under the supervision of Prof. Benzion Fuchs. He then spent four years as a Post Doctorate Fulbright fellow at Columbia University, working with Prof. W. Clark Still. After returning to Israel in 1997, he joined the pharmaceutical industry, working first at Peptor Ltd. for six years and then at Epix Pharmaceuticals until 2008. In 2009, he joined Bar Ilan University as an associate professor at the Department of Chemistry leading the molecular modeling, computer-aided drug design and chemoinformatics lab.

== Scientific interests and publications ==
Senderowitz's research focuses on the developing and application of new computational methods to design compounds (i.e., drugs, materials) with improved properties. This design strategy is multi-disciplinary in nature and consists of various levels of theory, different computational techniques, and different machine learning algorithms. Senderowitz is known for the following areas of research: (1) Research on CFTR (Cystic fibrosis transmembrane conductance regulator), the main protein implicated in the genetic disease Cystic fibrosis, both at the level of the full-length protein and of its domains. His basic research focuses on understanding the dynamics of the protein and on the mechanism of action of deleterious, rescuing and stabilizing perturbations to its domains, while his translation research focuses on CFTR as a target for drug discovery. (2) Research on chemoinformatics and materials informatics, focusing on the development of new machine learning algorithms as well as on their application in various areas, for example, for the analysis and development of solar cells with improved photovoltaic properties. (3) Research on computational agriculture including plant disease biocontrol studying anti-bacterial peptides expressed on virus nanoparticles, design of new pesticides in the form of small molecules that inhibits the bacterial quorum sensing machinery, and the design of new sustainable pesticides in the form of peptide aptamers and small molecules that would interfere with cell building enzymes of bacteria. (4) Research on different drug discovery projects, in particular in the field of neurodegenerative diseases such as ALS, Alzheimer, familial dysautonomia and the vanishing white material disease as well as diabetes, and calcification-related diseases and autoimmune disease.

He has over 90 peer-reviewed articles, and has contributed to various book chapters.
