= Elizabeth Hardy =

Elizabeth Hardy may refer to:

- Elisabeth Hardy (1923–2016), Bletchley Park decoder
- Elizabeth Hardy (novelist) (1794–1854), Irish writer
- Elizabeth Hardy (chemist) (fl. 1940), American organic chemist
