= Arthur Cope =

Arthur Cope may refer to:

- Arthur C. Cope (1909–1966), organic chemist
- Arthur Stockdale Cope (1857–1940), English portrait painter
