= Boscalid =

Chemical compound used to kill fungi

Names
- Preferred IUPAC name 2-chloro-N-(4'-chloro[1,1'-biphenyl]-2-yl)pyridine-3-carboxamide
- Other names BAS 510F, Nicobifen

Identifiers
CAS Number	188425-85-6
3D model (JSmol)	Interactive image
Beilstein Reference	10092464
ChEBI	CHEBI:81822
ChEMBL	ChEMBL1076544
ChemSpider	184713
DrugBank	DB12792
ECHA InfoCard	100.115.343
EC Number	606-143-0
KEGG	C18547
PubChem CID	213013
UNII	32MS8ZRD1V
CompTox Dashboard (EPA)	DTXSID6034392
- InChI: InChI=1S/C18H12Cl2N2O/c19-13-9-7-12(8-10-13)14-4-1-2-6-16(14)22-18(23)15-5-3-11-21-17(15)20/h1-11H,(H,22,23)/f/h22H Key: WYEMLYFITZORAB-UHFFFAOYSA-N
- SMILES: C1=CC=C(C(=C1)C2=CC=C(C=C2)Cl)NC(=O)C3=C(N=CC=C3)Cl

Properties
Chemical formula	C_{18}H_{12}Cl_{2}N_{2}O
Molar mass	343.21
Appearance	off-white crystalline powder
Density	1.381 g/cm^{3}
Melting point	143 °C (289 °F; 416 K)
Solubility in water	4.6 mg/L (20 °C)
log P	2.96

Hazards
- GHS labelling
Pictograms	(GHS09: Environmental hazard)
Hazard statements	H411
Precautionary statements	P273, P391, P501
- Except where otherwise noted, data are given for materials in their standard state (at 25 °C [77 °F], 100 kPa). Infobox references

Boscalid is a broad spectrum fungicide used in agriculture to protect crops from fungal diseases. It was first marketed by BASF in 2002 using their brand name Endura. The compound is an biphenyl amide derived inhibitor of succinate dehydrogenase.

== History ==
Inhibition of succinate dehydrogenase, the complex II in the mitochondrial respiration chain, has been known as a fungicidal mechanism of action since the first examples were marketed in the 1960s. The first compound in this class was carboxin, which had a narrow spectrum of useful biological activity, mainly on basidiomycetes and was used as a seed treatment. Many companies made analogues with the aim of expanding the range of fungal species controlled and boscalid was one of the first compounds successful in doing so.

== Synthesis ==
The following three step synthesis of boscalid was disclosed in patents filed by BASF in 1995.

The aminobiphenyl required for reaction with the acid chloride of 2-chloronicotinic acid is prepared in two steps. The first is a palladium-catalysed Suzuki reaction with 2-chloro-1-nitrobenzene and 4-chloro-phenylboronic acid, followed by hydrogenation of the nitro group. As the final is product used nearly worldwide at the multi-tonne scale, considerable efforts have been made to improve yields.

== Mechanism of action ==
Succinate dehydrogenase inhibitors (SDHI) of this type act by binding at the quinone reduction site of the enzyme complex, preventing ubiquinone from doing so. As a consequence, the tricarboxylic acid cycle and electron transport chain cannot function.

== Usage ==
Boscalid has fungicidal effects against a wide range of crop pests. These include Alternaria species, grey mold (Botrytis cinerea), white mold (Sclerotinia sclerotiorum), and powdery mildew (Uncinula necator). As a result, it is used in the production of fruits, soybeans and vegetables.

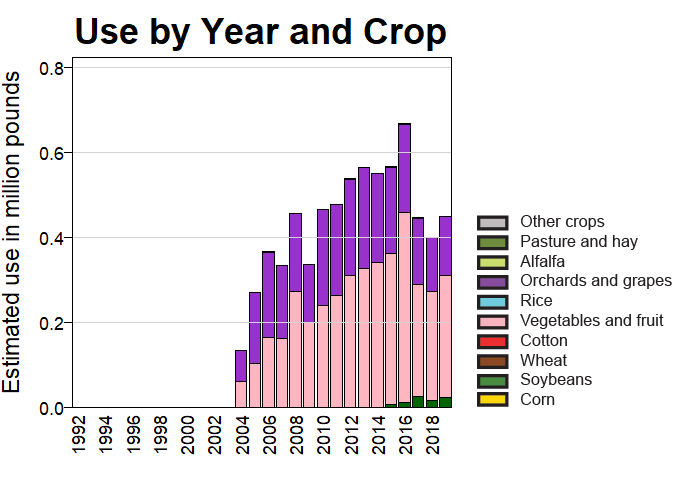
Boscalid usage in the US to 2019 (estimated)

The estimated annual use of boscalid in US agriculture is mapped by the US Geological Survey and shows that it is mainly applied to fruit crops, with a maximum use of over 600,000 pounds (270,000 kg) in 2016. Global sales in 2014 were estimated at $390 million. The compound lacks full control of important cereal crop diseases, especially Zymoseptoria tritici.

== Human safety ==
Boscalid has low acute toxicity: the Codex Alimentarius database maintained by the FAO lists the maximum residue limits for it in various food products.

== Environmental effects ==
The compound is very persistent in field conditions and its environmental fate and consequent ecotoxicology have been reviewed.

== Resistance management ==
Fungal populations have the ability to develop resistance to SDHI inhibitors. This potential can be mitigated by careful management. Reports of individual pest species becoming resistant are monitored by manufacturers, regulatory bodies such as the EPA and the Fungicides Resistance Action Committee (FRAC). The risks of resistance developing can be reduced by using a mixture of two or more fungicides which each have activity on relevant pests but with unrelated mechanisms of action. FRAC assigns fungicides into classes so as to facilitate this.

== Brands ==
Boscalid is the ISO common name for the active ingredient which is formulated into the branded product sold to end-users. It was also known as nicobifen. Endura and Emerald are the brand names first used by BASF's formulations but the compound has subsequently been sold under a range of product names.
