= Helma Wennemers =

German chemist

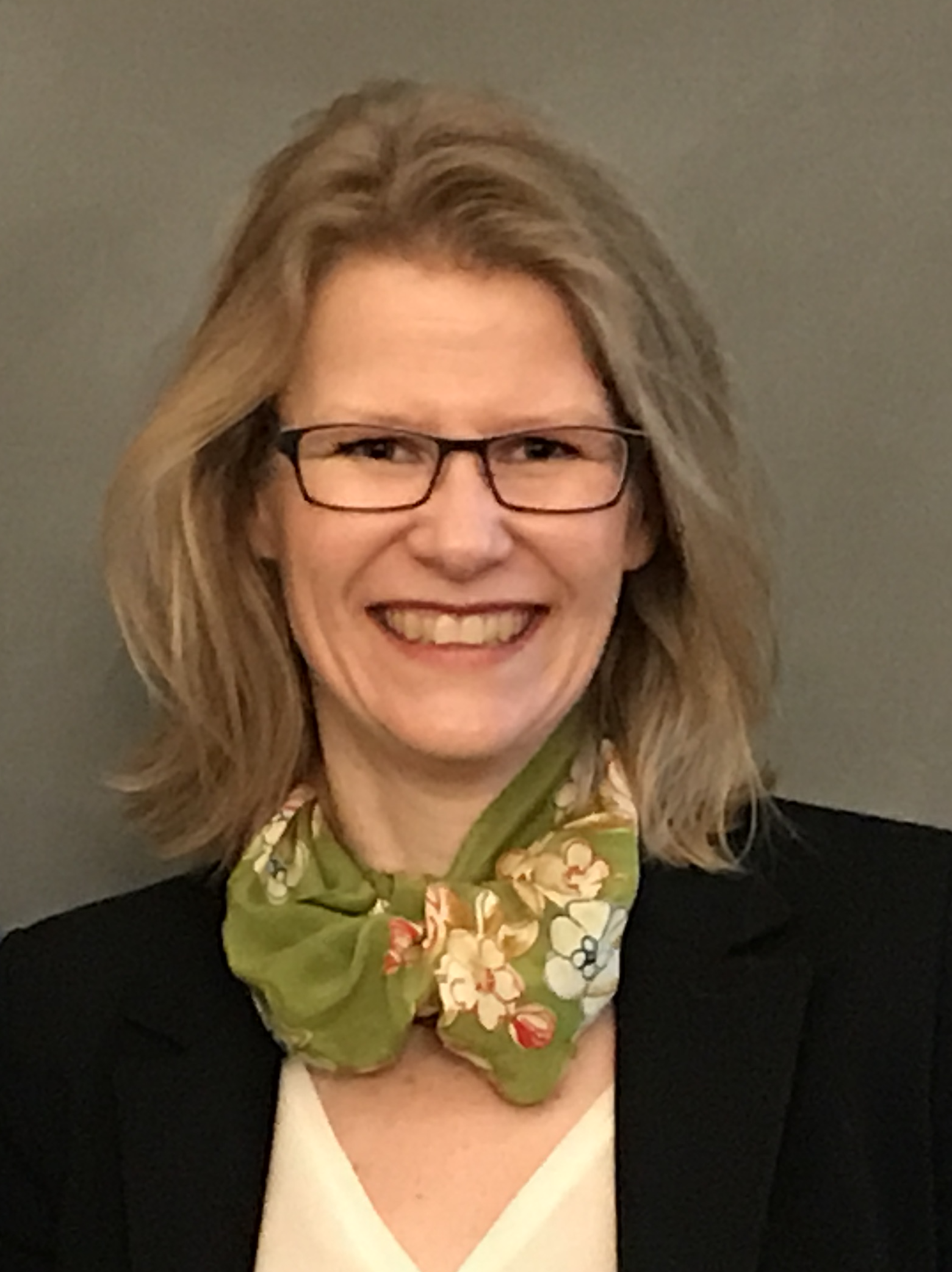
Helma Wennemers

Helma B. Wennemers (born 24 June 1969 in Offenbach am Main) is a German organic chemist. She is a professor of organic chemistry at the Swiss Federal Institute of Technology in Zurich (ETH Zurich).

== Education ==
Helma Wennemers studied chemistry at the Goethe University Frankfurt, completing her diploma thesis with Gerhard Quinkert in 1993. She earned her PhD at Columbia University, New York in 1996, under the supervision of W. Clark Still, with a thesis "Encoded combinatorial chemistry: a tool for the study of selective intermolecular interactions." Between 1996 and 1998, she was a postdoctoral fellow at Nagoya University with Hisashi Yamamoto, before being appointed Bachem Assistant Professor at the University of Basel in 1999. She held this post until 2003, where she was promoted to associate professor. In 2011, she moved to ETH Zurich as a professor of organic chemistry.

== Research ==
Wennemers' research focuses on proline-rich peptides.

- Asymmetric Catalysis:

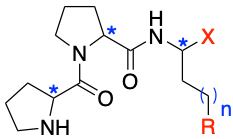
Tripeptidic catalyst of the H-Pro-Pro-Xaa type

Wennemers led the development of tripeptides containing H-Pro-Pro-Xaa type sequences (Pro: proline, Xaa: any amine) as organocatalysts for C–C bond formations based on an enamine mechanism. High reactivity, stereo- and chemoselectivity for aldol or conjugate addition reactions can be achieved by varying the absolute configuration of the single amino acids as well as the functional group of the Xaa residue. The modularity of the peptides enabled creation of catalysts capable of catalyzing the conjugate addition reactions of aldehydes to nitroolefins with as little as 0.05 mol% of tripeptidic catalyst.

She also worked on other organocatalyzed transformations. Inspired by natural polyketide synthases—which use malonic acid half thioesters (MAHTs) as thioester enolate equivalents — she developed organocatalytic methods for stereoselective addition reactions of MAHTs (and protected variants monothiomalonates, MTMs) to electrophiles using cinchona alkaloid derived catalysts. The introduction of fluorinated MAHTs and MTMs allowed for the stereoselective introduction of fluorine substituents in fluoroacetate aldol reactions as well as further addition reactions to imines and nitroolefins.

- Chemical Biology:

In chemical biology, Wennemers uses larger proline-rich peptides, such as collagen model peptides or oligoprolines, for applications such as tumor targeting, cell penetration or drug delivery. She utilized Cγ-functionalized proline derivatives for the functionalization and stabilization of short-chained collagen triple helices. Further, she introduced aminoproline and γ-azaproline as pH-sensitive probes to tune the conformational stability of the collagen triple helix by pH change. In the field of cell penetrating peptides (CPPs), Wennemers showed that preorganization of cationic charges along an oligoproline backbone enhanced the cellular uptake of CPPs compared to more flexible oligoarginines with undefined charge display. Moreover, the oligoproline-based CPPs demonstrated a defined nuclear localization and high proteolytic stability as well as low cytotoxicity.

- Synthetic Materials:

Wennemers utilizes peptides to control the morphology of nanostructured materials for generation of ordered mesoscopic materials. She developed tripeptides for the size-controlled generation of mono-disperse, water-soluble silver-, palladium-, platinum-, and gold nanoparticles. Recently, she reported peptide‐stabilized platinum nanoparticles that have greater toxicity against hepatic cancer cells (HepG2) than against other cancer cells and non‐cancerous liver cells. Wennemers also explored conjugates of oligoprolines and π-conjugated systems that form hierarchical self-assemblies with diverse morphologies (e.g. nanofibers, nanorods, nanosheets). She used such a conjugate to prepare the first example of an extended triaxial supramolecular weave held together through the interplay of weak non-covalent interactions.

== Awards ==
Wennemers work was recognized by the Leonidas Zervas Award of the European Peptide Society (2010), the Pedler Award of the Royal Society of Chemistry (2016), the Inhoffen Medal (2017), the Netherlands Scholar Award for Supramolecular Chemistry (2019), the Arthur C. Cope Scholar Award of the American Chemical Society (2021), the Scoffone Prize of the Italian Peptide Society (2022), and the Vincent du Vigneaud Award of the American Peptide Society (2023). She also won ths 2020 Spark Award (invention) and the 2023 Golden Owl Award (teaching) from the ETH Zurich. Wennemers was awarded the Emil Fischer Medal by the German Chemical Society on September 7, 2026, for her pioneering work on synthetic peptides, becoming the first woman to win the award in its 114-year history.
