= Elizabeth Hardy (chemist) =

Canadian-American chemist (1915–2008)

Elizabeth MacGregor Hardy
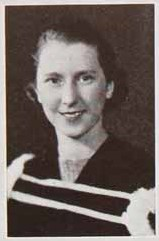
- Born: July 31, 1915
- Died: June 26, 2008 (aged 92)
- Education: Bryn Mawr College
- Scientific career
- Fields: Organic Chemistry
- Thesis: Molecular Rearrangements in Three Carbon Systems (1942)

Elizabeth MacGregor Hardy (July 31, 1915 – June 26, 2008) was a Canadian-American chemist who discovered the Cope rearrangement while working in Arthur C. Cope's research group at Bryn Mawr College. The rearrangement drew upon the electronic models of Edward D. Hughes and Christopher Kelk Ingold, but also the non-electronic work of Rainer Ludwig Claisen and Ernst Tietze.

== Early life and education ==
Elizabeth MacGregor Hardy was born in Ottawa, Ontario, Canada to parents Thomas Woodburne Hardy and Margaret Ada (Graham) Hardy. Hardy attended McGill University and graduated with a Bachelor in Science in 1938. In 1939, Hardy obtained a Master of Arts degree from Bryn Mawr College. She went on to earn a Ph.D. in organic chemistry in 1942 at Bryn Mawr College, working in the labs of Arthur C. Cope. Hardy and Evelyn Hancock, another graduate student, coauthored nearly half of Cope's papers from Bryn Mawr.

Hardy went on to work for American Cyanamid.

== Career and research ==
Hardy worked as assistant professor of organic chemistry at Bryn Mawr College in 1939 and 1940. In the years 1942–1958, Hardy worked as a chemist at Calco Chemical Division, subsequently she worked as a literature chemist at Lederle Labs from 1958 to 1975. After working for Lederle, Hardy worked as a senior resident literature chemist for American Cyanamid Company from 1975 on. She was a member of the American Association for the Advancement of Science, American Chemical Society and Chemical Institute of Canada. Hardy worked in a number of different research areas including molecular rearrangements, preparation of unsaturated esters and ketones, vat dyestuffs, esterification of leuco vat dyes, organosulfur compounds, and pharmaceutical chemistry.

== Publications and patents ==
Hardy has a considerable number of publications and patents under her name and in collaboration with other scientists.

- The Introduction of Substituted Vinyl Groups. V. A Rearrangement Involving the Migration of an Allyl Group in a Three-Carbon System. Arthur C. Cope and Elizabeth M. Hardy. Publication date: February 1, 1940
- The Introduction of Substituted Vinyl Groups. VI. The Regeneration of Substituted Vinyl Malonic Esters from their Sodium Enolates. Arthur C. Cope and Elizabeth M. Hardy. Publication date: December 1, 1940
- The Rearrangement of Allyl Groups in Three-Carbon Systems. Arthur C. Cope, Corris M. Hofmann and Elizabeth M. Hardy. Publication date: July 1, 1941
- Aminoalcohols and their Esters. Evelyn M. Hancock, Elizabeth M. Hardy, Dorothea Heyl, Mary Elizabeth Wright and Arthur C. Cope. Publication date: October 1, 1944
- Study of the Aqueous Esterification of Anthrahydroquinones. Mario Scalera, William B. Hardy, Elizabeth M. Hardy and Asa W. Joyce. Publication Date:July 1, 1951
- Some new methods for preparing bunte salts. Hans Z. Lecher and Elizabeth M. Hardy. Publication date: April 1, 1955
- Manufacture of sulphuric ester salts of phenols. Hans Z. Lecher, Plainfleld, Mario Scalera, Somerville, Elizabeth M. Hardy, Bound Brook. Patented: June 25, 1946
- Preparation of pentaalkylguanidines. Hans Z. Lecher, Plainfleld, Elizabeth M. Hardy, Bound Brook, Clement L. Kosloski, North Easton. Patented: July 29, 1958
- Trichloromethyl benzenethio-sulfonates. Elizabeth M. Hardy and John F. Hosler, Bound Brook, Glentworth Lamb, Stamford. Patented: March 24, 1959
- Trichloromethyl 2-methoxy-5-phosphono-benzenethiolsulfonate pesticides. Elizabeth M. Hardy, Hohokus Patented: January 16, 1962
- Preparation of s-aryl-thiosulfuric acids. Hans Z. Lecher, Plainfleld, Elizabeth M. Hardy, Bound Brook. Patented: April 12, 1955
- Preparation of s-aryl-thiosulfuric acids. Hans Z. Lecher, Plainfleld, Elizabeth M. Hardy, Bound Brook. Patented: July 5, 1955
- 4-alkylmorpholine sulfur trioxide compounds. Mario Scalera, Somerville, Charles T. Lester, De Kalb, Elizabeth M. Hardy, Bound Brook. Patented: November 30, 1948
- Soluble vat dyes of the acridone series. William B. Hardy and Elizabeth M. Hardy, Bound Brook. Patented: August 18, 1953
