= Aminobiphenyl =

Aminobiphenyl may refer to:

- 2-Aminobiphenyl (2-APB)
- 3-Aminobiphenyl
- 4-Aminobiphenyl (4-APB)
