= Platinum(II) acetate =

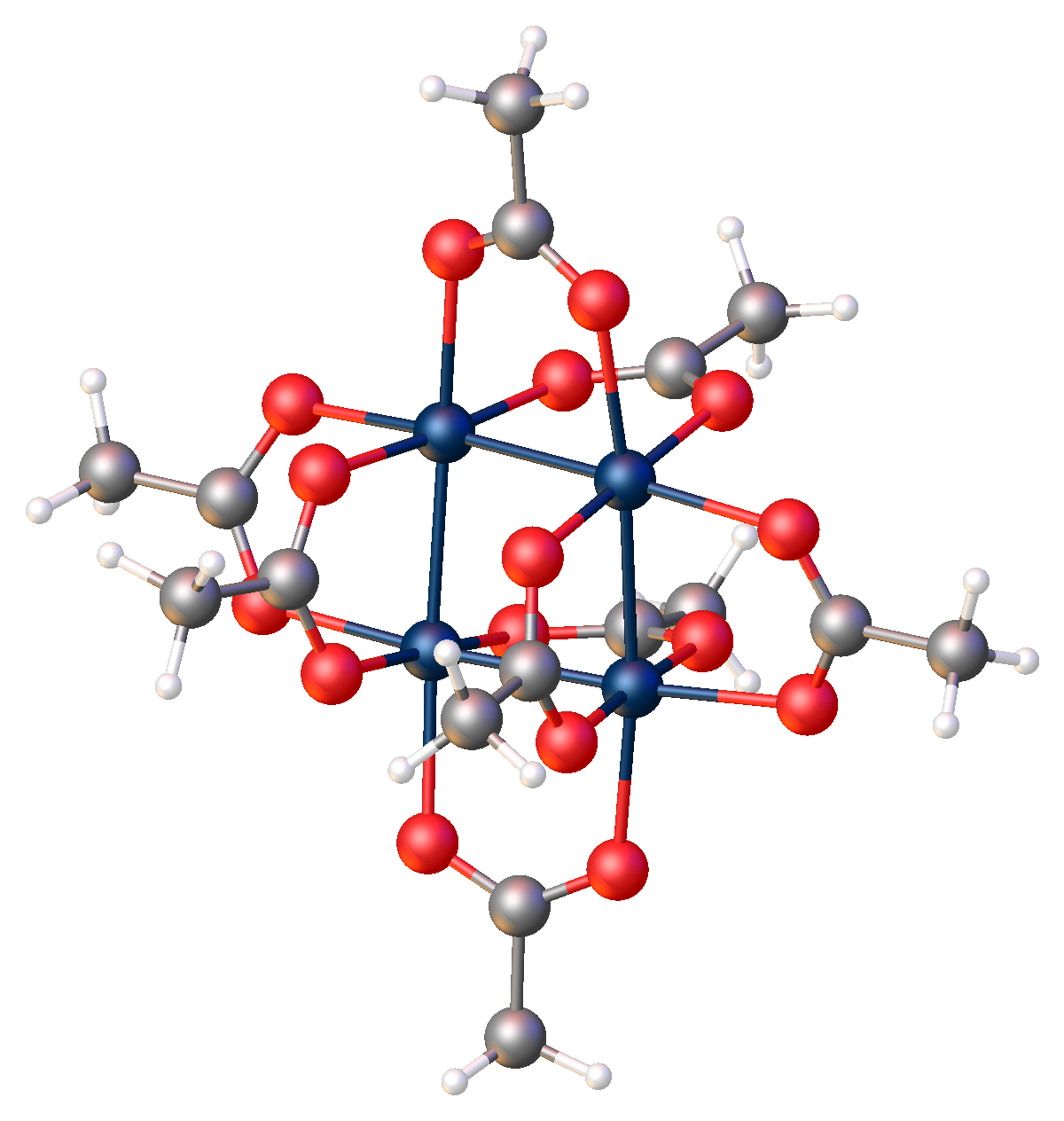

Names
- Other names platinum diacetate, platinum acetate

Identifiers
CAS Number	3375-34-6
3D model (JSmol)	Interactive image
ChemSpider	9326225
PubChem CID	11151117
CompTox Dashboard (EPA)	DTXSID501336798
- InChI: InChI=1S/2C2H4O2.Pt/c2*1-2(3)4;/h2*1H3,(H,3,4);/q;;+2/p-2 Key: QCSGLAMXZCLSJW-UHFFFAOYSA-L
- SMILES: CC(=O)[O-].CC(=O)[O-].[Pt+2]

Properties
Chemical formula	Pt(CH_{3}CO_{2})_{2}
Molar mass	315.19 g/mol
Appearance	purple solid
Density	3.374 g/cm^{3}
Melting point	245 °C (473 °F; 518 K) decomposition
Solubility in water	Insoluble

Structure
Crystal structure	tetragonal
Space group	P4_{3}2_{1}2, No. 96
Lattice constant	a = 10.254 Å, c = 50.494 Å
Formula units (Z)	8 tetrameric molecules
- Except where otherwise noted, data are given for materials in their standard state (at 25 °C [77 °F], 100 kPa). Infobox references

Platinum(II) acetate is a purple-colored coordination complex. The complex adopts an unusual structure consisting of a square array of Pt atoms.

== Structure ==
According to X-ray crystallography, the complex is tetrameric, in contrast to the trimeric palladium analog. The four platinum atoms form a square cluster, with eight bridging acetate ligands surrounding them. The compound has slight distortions from idealized D_{2d} symmetry. The crystal is tetragonal.

== Preparation ==
Several syntheses of platinum(II) acetate have been reported. Geoffrey Wilkinson et al. reported a highly temperamental synthesis from sodium hexahydroxyplatinate, nitric acid, and acetic acid. This intermediate solution was reducted with formic acid.

Alternatively, the complex can be prepared by the reaction of silver acetate with platinum(II) chloride.
