= Virus nanotechnology =

Use of viruses as a source of nanoparticles for biomedical purposes

Virus nanotechnology is the use of viruses as a source of nanoparticles for biomedical purposes. Viruses are made up of a genome and a capsid; and some viruses are enveloped. Most virus capsids measure between 20-500 nm in diameter. Because of their nanometer size dimensions, viruses have been considered as naturally occurring nanoparticles. Virus nanoparticles have been subject to the nanoscience and nanoengineering disciplines. Viruses can be regarded as prefabricated nanoparticles. Many different viruses have been studied for various applications in nanotechnology: for example, mammalian viruses are being developed as vectors for gene delivery, and bacteriophages and plant viruses have been used in drug delivery and imaging applications as well as in vaccines and immunotherapy intervention.

== Overview ==
Virus nanotechnology is one of the emerging disciplines in nanotechnology. Being an interdisciplinary field, viral nanotechnology occupies the interface between virology, biotechnology, chemistry, and materials science. The field employs viral nanoparticles (VNPs) and its counterparts of virus-like nanoparticles (VLPs) for potential applications in the fields of electronics, sensors, and most significantly at clinical field. VNPs and VLPs are attractive building blocks for several reasons. Both particles are on the nanometer-size scale; they are monodisperse with a high degree of symmetry and polyvalency; they can be produced on large scale; they are stable and robust, and they are biocompatible, and in some cases, orally bioavailable. They are "programmable" units that can be modified by either genetic modification or chemical bioconjugation methods.

== What is nanotechnology? ==
Nanotechnology is the manipulation or self-assembly of individual atoms, molecules, or, molecular clusters into structures to create materials and devices with new or vastly different properties. Nanotechnology can work from the top down (which means reducing the size of the smallest structures to the nanoscale) or bottom up (which involves manipulating individual atoms and molecules into nanostructures) .The definition of nanotechnology is based on the prefix "nano" which is from the Greek word meaning "dwarf". In more technical terms, the word "nano" means 10^{−9}, or one billionth of something. For a meaningful comparison, a virus is roughly 100 nanometers (nm) in size. So that a virus can also call as a nanoparticle. The word nanotechnology is generally used when referring to materials with the size of 0.1 to 100 nanometres, however, it is also inherent that these materials should display different properties from bulk (or micrometric and larger) materials as a result of their size. These differences include physical strength, chemical reactivity, electrical conductance, magnetism and optical effects.

Nanotechnology has a range of applications in biology, biotechnology, and biomedicine. Nanotechnology provides the ability to produce and utilize materials, devices, and systems through the control of matter on the nanometer scale (1 to 50 nm). Nanotechnology has had several commercial applications in advanced laser technology, hard coatings, photography, pharmaceuticals, printing, chemical-mechanical polishing, and cosmetics. Possible future applications of nanotechnology include lighter cars using nanoparticle reinforced polymers, orally applicable insulin, artificial joints made from nanoparticulate materials, and low-calorie foods with nanoparticulate taste enhancers.

== Viruses as building blocks in nanotechnology ==
Viruses have long been studied as deadly pathogens to cause disease in all living forms. By the 1950s, researchers had begun thinking of viruses as tools in addition of pathogens. Bacteriophage genomes and components of the protein expression machinery have been widely utilized as tools for understanding the fundamental cellular process. On the basis of these studies, several viruses have been exploited as expression systems in biotechnology. Later in the 1970s, viruses are used as a vector for the benefit of humans. Since that, often viruses are used as vectors for gene therapy, cancer control and control of harmful or damaging organisms, in both agriculture and medicine.

Recently, a new approach to exploiting viruses and their capsids for biotechnology began to change toward using them for nanotechnology application. Researchers Douglas and Young (Montana State University, Bozeman, MT, USA) were the first to consider the utility of a virus capsid as a nanomaterial. They have taken plant virus Cowpea Chlorotic Mottle Virus (CCMV) for their study. CCMV showed a highly dynamic platform with pH and metal ion dependent structural transitions. Douglas and Young made use of these capsid dynamics and exchanged the natural cargo (nucleic acid) with synthetic materials. Since then many materials have been encapsulated into CCMV and other VNPs. At about the same time, the research team led by Mann (University of Bristol, UK) pioneered a new area using the rod-shaped particles of TMV (Tobacco Mosaic Virus). The particles were used as templates for the fabrication of a range of metallized nanotube structures using mineralization techniques. TMV particles have also been utilized to generate various structures (nanotubes and nanowires) for use in batteries and data storage devices.

Viral capsids have attracted great interest in the field of nanobiology because of their nanoscale size, symmetrical structural organization, load capacity, controllable self-assembly, and ease of modification. viruses are essentially naturally occurring nanomaterials capable of self-assembly with a high degree of precision. Viral capsid- nanoparticle hybrid structures, which combine the bio-activities of virus capsids with the functions of nanoparticles, are a new class of bionanomaterials that have many potential applications as therapeutic and diagnostic vectors, imaging agents, and advanced nanomaterial synthesis reactors.

== Plant viruses in nanotechnology ==
Plant virus-based systems, in particular, are among the most advanced and exploited for their potential use as bioinspired structured nanomaterials and nano-vectors. Plant virus nanoparticles are non-infectious to mammalian cells also proved by Raja muthuramalingam et al. 2018. Plant viruses have a size particularly suitable for nanoscale applications and can offer several advantages. In fact, they are structurally uniform, robust, biodegradable and easy to produce. Moreover, many are the examples regarding functionalization of plant virus-based nanoparticles by means of modification of their external surface and by loading cargo molecules into their internal cavity. This plasticity in terms of nanoparticles engineering is the ground on which multivalency, payload containment and targeted delivery can be fully exploited.

George P. Lomonossoff writing in "Recent Advances in Plant Virology", The capsids of most plant viruses are simple and robust structures consisting of multiple copies of one or a few types of protein subunit arranged with either icosahedral or helical symmetry. The capsids can be produced in large quantities either by the infection of plants or by the expression of the subunit(s) in a variety of heterologous systems. In view of their relative simplicity and ease of production, plant virus particles or virus-like particles (VLPs) have attracted much interest over the past 20 years for applications in both bio- and nanotechnology [Lomonossoff, 2011]. As result, plant virus particles have been subjected to both genetic and chemical modification, have been used to encapsulate foreign material and have themselves, been incorporated into supramolecular structures. Significantly, plant viruses studied are not human pathogens, which have no natural tendency to interact with human cell surface receptors. Recently, a plant pathogenic virus was reportedly used to synthesize a noble hybrid metal nanomaterials used as bio-semiconductor.

=== Plant viruses ===
Viruses cause several destructive plant diseases and are accountable for massive losses in crop production and quality in all parts of the world. Infected plants may show a range of symptoms depending on the disease but often there is severe leaf curling, stunting (abnormalities in the whole plant) and leaf yellowing (either of the whole leaf or in a pattern of stripes or blotches). Most plant viruses are therefore transmitted by a vector organism (insects, nematodes, plasmodiophorids and mites) that feeds on the plant or (in some diseases) are introduced through wounds made, for example during agriculture practices (e.g. pruning). Many plant viruses, for example, tobacco mosaic virus, have been used as model systems to provide a basic understanding of how viruses express genes and replicate. Others permitted the elucidation of the processes underlying RNA silencing, now recognised as a core epigenetic mechanism underpinning numerous areas of biology.

== Some properties of viral nanoparticles ==
- Plant viruses come in many shapes and sizes: for example, the plant virus Tobacco mosaic virus (TMV) measures 300x18 nm in size; it forms a hollow rod. The plant virus Potato virus X (PVX) forms flexible filaments of 515x13 nm. The following viruses have an icosahedral symmetry and measure between 25-30 nm: plant virus Cowpea mosaic virus (CPMV), bacteriophage Qbeta and mammalian adeno-associated virus (AAV).
- These are just some examples, many different viruses are being engineered and studied for their potential applications in medicine, some examples of plant viruses include Cowpea chlorotic mottle virus, Red clover necrotic mottle virus, Physalis mosaic virus, Papaya mosaic virus.
- Plant viruses and bacteriophages are not infectious toward mammals. In contrast to mammalian viruses, there is no risk of a viral infection.
- Virus-like particles (VLPs) can be produced that lack the viral genome; these VLPs are non-infectious also toward plants and thus considered safe also from an agricultural point of view.
- Viruses and their non-infectious counterparts can be produced through molecular farming in plants or fermentation in cell culture.
- The virus-based nanoparticles can be tailored for specific applications using a number of chemical biology approaches:
  - Genetic modification can be used to modify the amino acid sequence of the capsid protein (also known as coat protein).
  - Bioconjugate chemistry can be used to introduce non-biological or biological cargos.
  - Lastly, while often shown as rigid materials, the viruses are dynamic materials that undergo swelling and other conformational changes allowing for cargo to be infused or encapsulated into their viral capsids.

Manifold plant virus platform technologies are being developed and studied for many applications including:

- Vaccines: VLPs or epitope display platforms
- Immunotherapies: in situ vaccines
- Molecular imaging contrast agents
- Drug delivery: targeting both human health and plant health
- Battery electrodes
- Sensor applications
