= Periplanone B =

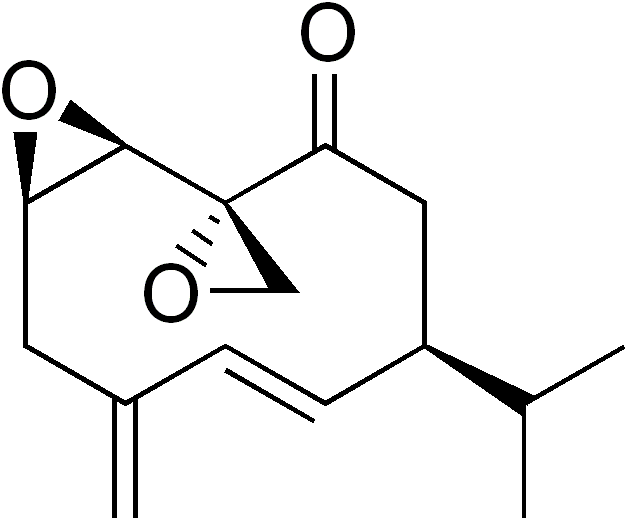

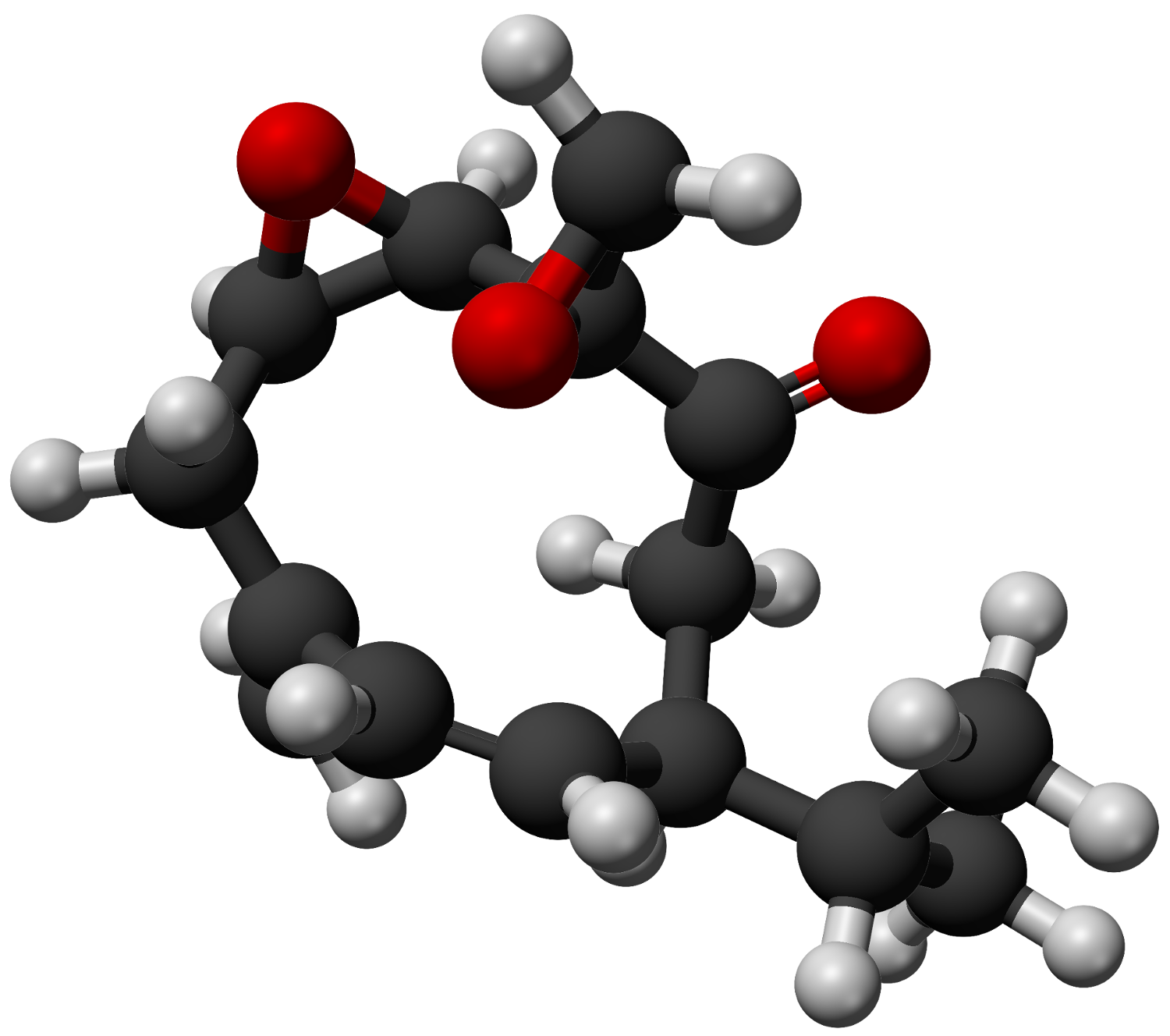

Names
- IUPAC name (5E)-1β,2β:10,14-Diepoxygermacra-4(15),5-dien-9-one
- Systematic IUPAC name (1R,2R,5S,6E,10R)-8-Methylidene-5-(propan-2-yl)-11-oxaspiro[bicyclo[8.1.0]undecane-2,2′-oxiran]-6-en-3-one
- Other names (1Z,5E)-1,10(14)-Diepoxy-4(15),5-germacradiene-9-one

Identifiers
CAS Number	61228-92-0
3D model (JSmol)	Interactive image
ChemSpider	9065530
PubChem CID	10890266
UNII	8HV41M9E86
CompTox Dashboard (EPA)	DTXSID4058441
- InChI: InChI=1S/C15H20O3/c1-9(2)11-5-4-10(3)6-12-14(18-12)15(8-17-15)13(16)7-11/h4-5,9,11-12,14H,3,6-8H2,1-2H3/b5-4+/t11-,12+,14+,15-/m0/s1 Key: KVFSFBCTIZBPRK-KGDVWTLMSA-N; InChI=1/C15H20O3/c1-9(2)11-5-4-10(3)6-12-14(18-12)15(8-17-15)13(16)7-11/h4-5,9,11-12,14H,3,6-8H2,1-2H3/b5-4+/t11-,12+,14+,15-/m0/s1 Key: KVFSFBCTIZBPRK-KGDVWTLMBF
- SMILES: O=C2[C@]1(OC1)[C@@H]3O[C@@H]3CC(\C=C\[C@H](C(C)C)C2)=C

Properties
Chemical formula	C_{15}H_{20}O_{3}
Molar mass	248.322 g·mol^{−1}
- Except where otherwise noted, data are given for materials in their standard state (at 25 °C [77 °F], 100 kPa). verify (what is ?) Infobox references

Periplanone B is a pheromone produced by the female American cockroach, Periplaneta americana. It is a sexual attractant to male cockroaches, especially at short ranges.

== History ==
The activity of this pheromone was first described in 1952, but it was not until 25 years later that Persoons et al. reported the gross structure of periplanones A and B. The stereochemical configuration and first total synthesis were reported by W. Clark Still's group at Columbia University in 1979.
