= Herrmann's catalyst =

Organopalladium compound used as a catalyst

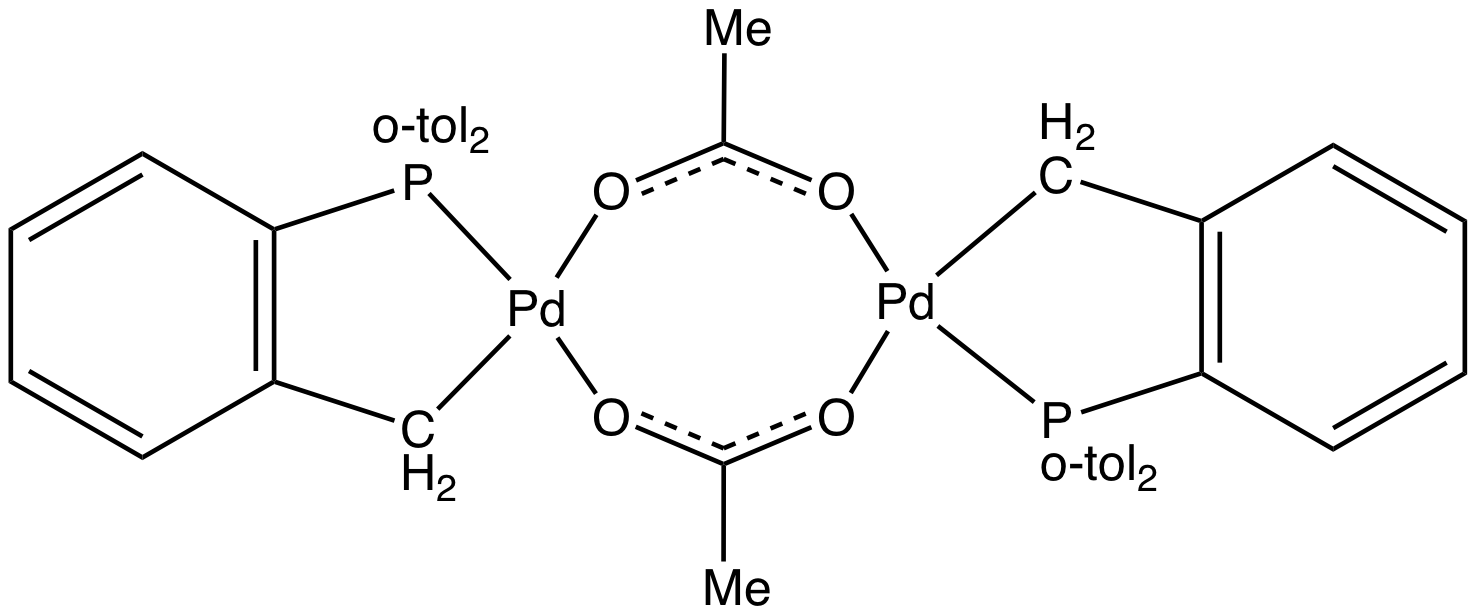

Identifiers
CAS Number	172418-32-5
3D model (JSmol)	Interactive image
ChemSpider	10136140
EC Number	681-425-4
PubChem CID	15978061
UNII	0K4FY6KS4N
CompTox Dashboard (EPA)	DTXSID40704833
- InChI: InChI=1S/2C21H20P.2C2H4O2.2Pd/c2*1-16-10-4-7-13-19(16)22(20-14-8-5-11-17(20)2)21-15-9-6-12-18(21)3;2*1-2(3)4;;/h2*4-15H,1H2,2-3H3;2*1H3,(H,3,4);;/q2*-1;;;2*+2/p-2 Key: AQTSNKXEMWZOGA-UHFFFAOYSA-L
- SMILES: CC1=CC=CC=C1P(C2=CC=CC=C2C)C3=CC=CC=C3[CH2-].CC1=CC=CC=C1P(C2=CC=CC=C2C)C3=CC=CC=C3[CH2-].CC(=O)[O-].CC(=O)[O-].[Pd+2].[Pd+2]

Properties
Chemical formula	C_{46}H_{46}O_{4}P_{2}Pd_{2}
Molar mass	937.66 g·mol^{−1}
Appearance	Yellow solid
Melting point	123–125 °C (253–257 °F; 396–398 K)

Hazards
- GHS labelling
Pictograms	(GHS07: Exclamation mark)
Signal word	Warning
Hazard statements	H315, H319, H335
Precautionary statements	P261, P264, P264+P265, P271, P280, P302+P352, P304+P340, P305+P351+P338, P319, P321, P332+P317, P337+P317, P362+P364, P403+P233, P405, P501
- Except where otherwise noted, data are given for materials in their standard state (at 25 °C [77 °F], 100 kPa). Infobox references

Herrmann's catalyst is an organopalladium compound that is a popular catalyst for the Heck reaction. It is a yellow air-stable solid that is soluble in organic solvents. Under conditions for catalysis, the acetate group is lost and the Pd-C bond undergoes protonolysis, giving rise to a source of "PdP(o-tol)_{3}".

== Preparation ==
The complex is made by reaction of tris(o-tolyl)phosphine with palladium(II) acetate:

2 Pd(OAc)_{2} + 2 P(o−tolyl)_{3} → 2 HOAc + Pd_{2}(OAc)_{2}[P(o−tolyl)(o−tolyl)_{2}]_{2}

== Related compounds ==
Many analogues of Hermann's catalyst have been developed, e.g. palladacycles obtained from 2-aminobiphenyl.
