= 3-Aminobiphenyl =

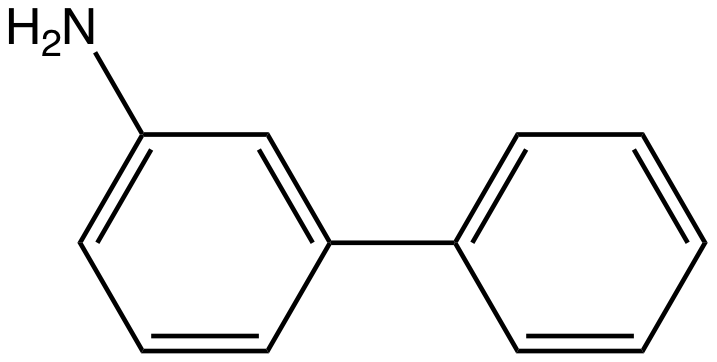

Names
- Preferred IUPAC name [1,1′-Biphenyl]-3-amine

Identifiers
CAS Number	2243-47-2
3D model (JSmol)	Interactive image
ChemSpider	15848
ECHA InfoCard	100.200.942
PubChem CID	16717
UNII	P632PQP3U1
CompTox Dashboard (EPA)	DTXSID2036825
- InChI: InChI=1S/C12H11N/c13-12-8-4-7-11(9-12)10-5-2-1-3-6-10/h1-9H,13H2 Key: MUNOBADFTHUUFG-UHFFFAOYSA-N
- SMILES: C1=CC=C(C=C1)C2=CC(=CC=C2)N

Properties
Chemical formula	C_{12}H_{11}N
Molar mass	169.227 g·mol^{−1}
Appearance	white solid
Density	1.077 g/cm3
Melting point	31–31.5 °C (87.8–88.7 °F; 304.1–304.6 K)
Boiling point	177–8 °C (351–46 °F; 450–281 K)

Hazards
- GHS labelling
Pictograms	(GHS07: Exclamation mark)
Signal word	Warning
Hazard statements	H302, H315, H319, H335
Precautionary statements	P261, P264, P270, P271, P280, P301+P312, P302+P352, P304+P340, P305+P351+P338, P312, P321, P330, P332+P313, P337+P313, P362, P403+P233, P405, P501
- Except where otherwise noted, data are given for materials in their standard state (at 25 °C [77 °F], 100 kPa). Infobox references

3-Aminobiphenyl is an organic compound with the formula C_{6}H_{5}C_{6}H_{4}NH_{2}. It is one of three monoamine derivatives of biphenyl. It is a colorless solid, although aged samples can appear colored. It is obtained from 3-bromoaniline and phenylboronic acid by Suzuki coupling.

== See also ==
- 2-Aminobiphenyl
- 4-Aminobiphenyl
