= Tris(o-tolyl)phosphine =

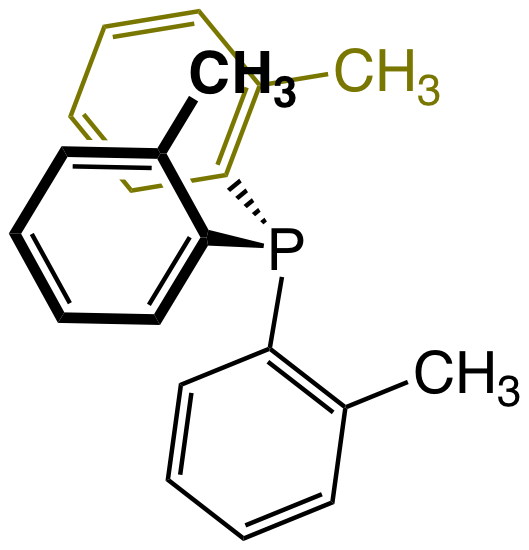

Names
- Preferred IUPAC name Tris(2-methylphenyl)phosphane
- Other names Tri(o-tolyl)phosphine; P(o-tol)3

Identifiers
CAS Number	6163-58-2 hydrate
3D model (JSmol)	Interactive image
Beilstein Reference	661212
ChemSpider	72513
ECHA InfoCard	100.025.631
EC Number	228-193-9
PubChem CID	80271
UNII	5M32DK8XA8
CompTox Dashboard (EPA)	DTXSID9064130
- InChI: InChI=1S/C21H21P/c1-16-10-4-7-13-19(16)22(20-14-8-5-11-17(20)2)21-15-9-6-12-18(21)3/h4-15H,1-3H3 Key: COIOYMYWGDAQPM-UHFFFAOYSA-N
- SMILES: CC1=CC=CC=C1P(C2=CC=CC=C2C)C3=CC=CC=C3C

Properties
Chemical formula	C_{21}H_{21}P
Molar mass	304.373 g·mol^{−1}
Appearance	White solid
Melting point	124 °C (255 °F; 397 K) ±1

Hazards
- GHS labelling
Pictograms	(GHS07: Exclamation mark) (GHS09: Environmental hazard)
Signal word	Warning
Hazard statements	H315, H319, H335, H410
Precautionary statements	P261, P264, P271, P273, P280, P302+P352, P304+P340, P305+P351+P338, P312, P321, P332+P313, P337+P313, P362, P391, P403+P233, P405, P501
- Except where otherwise noted, data are given for materials in their standard state (at 25 °C [77 °F], 100 kPa). Infobox references

Tris(o-tolyl)phosphine is an organophosphorus compound with the formula P(C_{6}H_{4}CH_{3})_{3}. It is a white, water-insoluble solid that is soluble in organic solvents. In solution it slowly converts to the phosphine oxide. As a phosphine ligand, it has a wide cone angle of 194°. Consequently, it tends to cyclometalate when treated with metal halides and metal acetates. Metal complexes of this ligand are somewhat common catalysts.

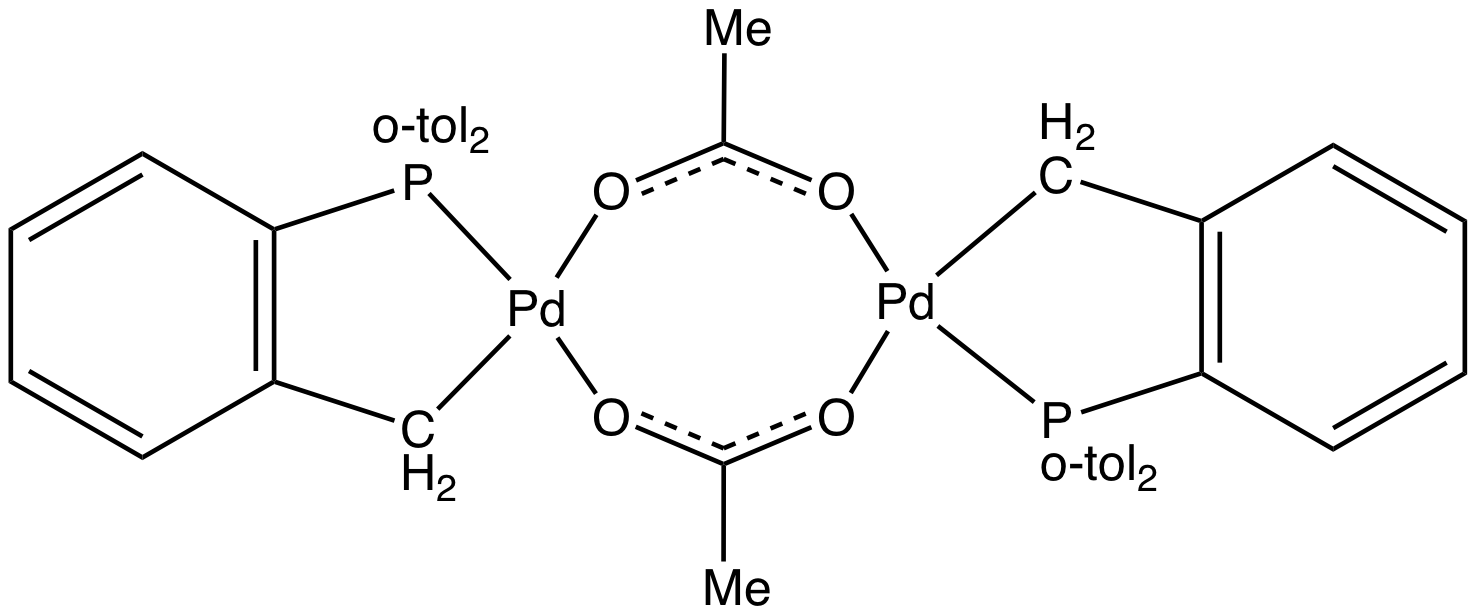
Structure of Herrmann's catalyst, which is derived from tris(o-tolyl)phosphine.

== See also ==
- Triphenylphosphine
