= Arthur C. Cope =

American organic chemist (1909–1966)

Arthur Clay Cope
- Born: June 27, 1909; Dunreith, Indiana, United States
- Died: June 4, 1966 (aged 56); Washington, D.C., United States
- Education: Butler University in Indianapolis BS; University of Wisconsin–Madison Ph.D.
- Known for: Cope elimination Cope rearrangement Palladacycle
- Awards: William H. Nichols Medal (1964); ACS Award in Pure Chemistry (1944); Member of the National Academy of Sciences
- Scientific career
- Fields: Organic chemistry
- Workplaces: Columbia University, Massachusetts Institute of Technology
- Doctoral advisor: Samuel M. McElvain

Arthur C. Cope (June 27, 1909 – June 4, 1966) was an American organic chemist and member of the United States National Academy of Sciences. He is credited with the development of several important chemical reactions which bear his name including the Cope elimination and the Cope rearrangement.

Cope was born on June 27, 1909, in Dunreith, Indiana. He received a bachelor's degree in chemistry from Butler University in Indianapolis in 1929 and a PhD in 1932 from the University of Wisconsin–Madison. His research continued at Harvard University in 1933 as a National Research Council Fellow. In 1934, he joined the faculty of Bryn Mawr College. There, his research included the first syntheses of a number of barbiturates including delvinyl sodium. At Bryn Mawr, Cope also developed a reaction involving the thermal rearrangement of an allyl group which eventually became known as the Cope rearrangement.

In 1941, Cope moved to Columbia University where he worked on projects associated with the war effort including chemical warfare agents, antimalarial drugs, and treatments for mustard gas poisoning. In 1945, he moved to the Massachusetts Institute of Technology to become the head of the Department of Chemistry.

== Awards and honors ==
- 1944 American Chemical Society Award in Pure Chemistry
- 1945 Elected to the American Academy of Arts and Sciences
- 1947 Elected to the National Academy of Sciences.
- 1961 Elected to the American Philosophical Society

Today, the Arthur C. Cope Award, in honor of his memory, is given out annually by the American Chemical Society to the most outstanding organic chemist.

== Literature ==
- Roberts, John D. & Sheehan, John C. (1991). "Arthur Clay Cope" (PDF). Biographical Memoirs of the National Academy of Sciences. 60: 17–27.
