= 2-Aminobiphenyl =

Names
- Preferred IUPAC name [1,1′-Biphenyl]-2-amine

Identifiers
CAS Number	90-41-5
3D model (JSmol)	Interactive image
ChEBI	CHEBI:232095
ChEMBL	ChEMBL296021
ChemSpider	6748
ECHA InfoCard	100.001.810
EC Number	201-990-9
PubChem CID	7015
UNII	8LQM58EBRY
CompTox Dashboard (EPA)	DTXSID3030189
- InChI: InChI=1S/C12H11N/c13-12-9-5-4-8-11(12)10-6-2-1-3-7-10/h1-9H,13H2 Key: TWBPWBPGNQWFSJ-UHFFFAOYSA-N
- SMILES: C1=CC=C(C=C1)C2=CC=CC=C2N

Properties
Chemical formula	C_{12}H_{11}N
Molar mass	169.227 g·mol^{−1}
Appearance	white solid
Density	1.077 g/cm^{3}
Melting point	51 °C (124 °F; 324 K)
Boiling point	299 °C (570 °F; 572 K)

Hazards
- GHS labelling
Pictograms	(GHS07: Exclamation mark) (GHS08: Health hazard)
Signal word	Warning
Hazard statements	H302, H351, H412
Precautionary statements	P201, P202, P264, P270, P273, P281, P301+P312, P308+P313, P330, P405, P501
- Except where otherwise noted, data are given for materials in their standard state (at 25 °C [77 °F], 100 kPa). Infobox references

2-Aminobiphenyl (2-ABP) is an organic compound with the formula C_{6}H_{5}C_{6}H_{4}NH_{2}. It is an amine derivative of biphenyl. It is a colorless solid that blackens with age. Palladacycles obtained from 2-aminobiphenyl are popular catalysts for cross-coupling.

It is prepared by hydrogenation of 2-nitrobiphenyl.

== See also ==
- 4-Aminobiphenyl
- Herrmann's catalyst
