= Ireland–Claisen rearrangement =

Chemical reaction

The Ireland–Claisen rearrangement is a chemical reaction of an allylic ester with strong base to give an γ,δ-unsaturated carboxylic acid.

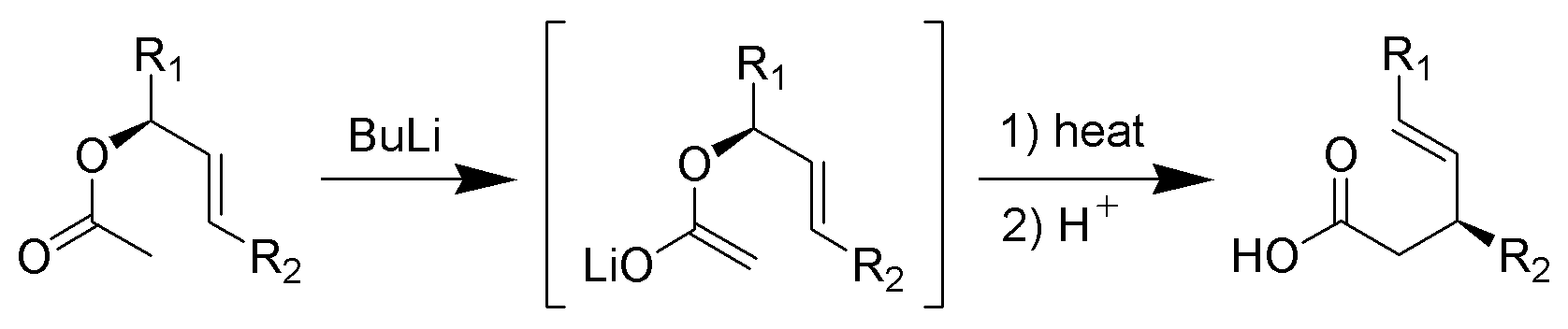
The Ireland-Claisen rearrangement

Several reviews have been published.

== Mechanism ==
The Ireland–Claisen rearrangement is a type of Claisen rearrangement. The mechanism is therefore a concerted [3,3]-sigmatropic rearrangement which according to the Woodward–Hoffmann rules show a concerted, suprafacial, pericyclic reaction pathway.

== See also ==
- Cope rearrangement
- Overman rearrangement
