= Claisen =

Claisen may refer to:

- Rainer Ludwig Claisen, a German chemist
  - Claisen rearrangement, a reaction of a allyl vinyl ether to a γ,δ-unsaturated carbonyl
  - Claisen condensation, a reaction between esters and carbonyl compounds in the presence of a strong base
  - Ireland–Claisen rearrangement, a chemical reaction of an allylic ester with strong base

== See also ==
- 5243 Clasien, a minor planet
