= Overman rearrangement =

Chemical reaction of allylic alcohols

The Overman rearrangement is a chemical reaction that can be described as a Claisen rearrangement of allylic alcohols to give allylic trichloroacetamides through an imidate intermediate. The Overman rearrangement was discovered in 1974 by Larry Overman.

The Overman rearrangement

The [3,3]-sigmatropic rearrangement is diastereoselective and requires heating or the use of Hg(II) or Pd(II) salts as catalysts. The resulting allylamine structures can be transformed into many chemically and biologically important natural and un-natural amino acids (like (1-adamantyl)glycine).

The Overman rearrangement may also be used for asymmetric synthesis.

== See also ==
- Pinner reaction
