= Allyl phenyl ether =

Names
- Preferred IUPAC name [(Prop-2-en-1-yl)oxy]benzene
- Other names (Allyloxy)benzene; 3-Phenoxypropene; Allyloxybenzene

Identifiers
CAS Number	1746-13-0
3D model (JSmol)	Interactive image
ChemSpider	21159535
ECHA InfoCard	100.015.569
EC Number	217-125-3
PubChem CID	74458
UNII	26S07OSX4O
CompTox Dashboard (EPA)	DTXSID6061943
- InChI: InChI=1S/C9H10O/c1-2-8-10-9-6-4-3-5-7-9/h2-7H,1,8H2 COPY Key: POSICDHOUBKJKP-UHFFFAOYSA-N
- SMILES: C=CCOc1ccccc1

Properties
Chemical formula	C_{9}H_{10}O
Molar mass	134.178 g·mol^{−1}
Appearance	colorless to yellowish liquid
Boiling point	191.7 °C (377.1 °F; 464.8 K)

Hazards
- GHS labelling
Pictograms	(GHS07: Exclamation mark)
Signal word	Warning
Hazard statements	H302, H312, H332
Precautionary statements	P261, P264, P270, P271, P280, P301+P312, P302+P352, P304+P312, P304+P340, P312, P322, P330, P363, P501
- Except where otherwise noted, data are given for materials in their standard state (at 25 °C [77 °F], 100 kPa). Infobox references

Allyl phenyl ether is an organic compound with the formula C_{6}H_{5}OCH_{2}CH=CH_{2}. It is a colourless to yellowish liquid.

== Preparation ==
Allyl phenyl ether is prepared by the reaction of sodium phenoxide with allyl bromide:

C_{6}H_{5}ONa + BrCH_{2}CH=CH_{2} → C_{6}H_{5}OCH_{2}CH=CH_{2} + NaBr

The yield is almost quantitative when the reaction is conducted in homogeneous solution using dimethoxyethane. When the reaction is conducted as a slurry in diethyl ether, the predominant product is, after acidic work-up, 2-allylphenol.

== Reactions ==
Allyl phenyl ether converts to 2-allylphenol in the presence of acid catalysts. This conversion is an example of the Claisen rearrangement.

The Claisen rearrangement
