= Carroll rearrangement =

Chemical reaction

The Carroll rearrangement is a rearrangement reaction in organic chemistry and involves the transformation of a β-keto allyl ester into a α-allyl-β-ketocarboxylic acid. This organic reaction is accompanied by decarboxylation and the final product is a γ,δ-allylketone. The Carroll rearrangement is an adaptation of the Claisen rearrangement and effectively a decarboxylative allylation.

The Carroll rearrangement (1940) in the presence of base and with high reaction temperature (path A) takes place through an intermediate enol which then rearranges in a sigmatropic Claisen rearrangement. The follow-up is a decarboxylation. This rearrangement is used in the conversion of linalool to geranylacetone.

Conversion of linalool to geranylacetone via Carroll rearrangement

== Palladium-catalyzed processes ==
With palladium(0) as a catalyst, the reaction (Tsuji, 1980) is much milder (path B) with an intermediate allyl cation / carboxylate organometallic complex.

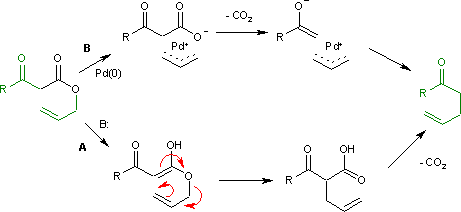
reaction mechanism

Decarboxylation precedes allylation as evidenced by this reaction catalyzed by tetrakis(triphenylphosphine)palladium(0):

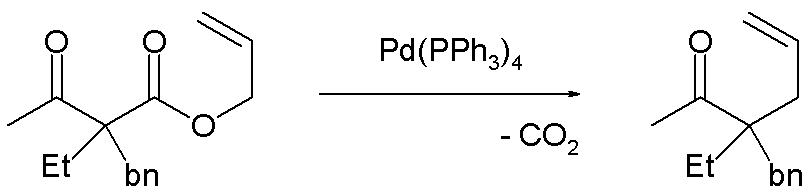
Decarboxylative allylation mechanistic

=== Asymmetric decarboxylative allylation ===
By introducing suitable chiral ligands, the reaction becomes enantioselective.

The first reported asymmetric rearrangement is catalyzed by tris(dibenzylideneacetone)dipalladium(0) and the Trost ligand:

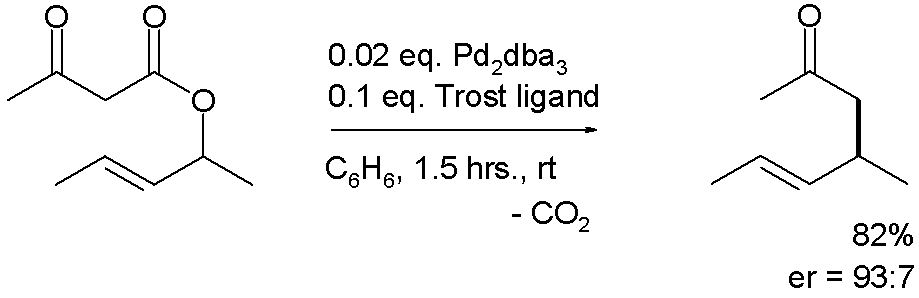
Asymmetric allylic alkylation of ketone enolates

A similar reaction uses additional naphthol.

Asymmetric Carrol rearrangement

This reaction delivers the main enantiomer with 88% enantiomeric excess. It remains to be seen if this reaction will have a wide scope because the acetamido group appears to be a prerequisite.

The same catalyst but a different ligand is employed in this enantioconvergent reaction:

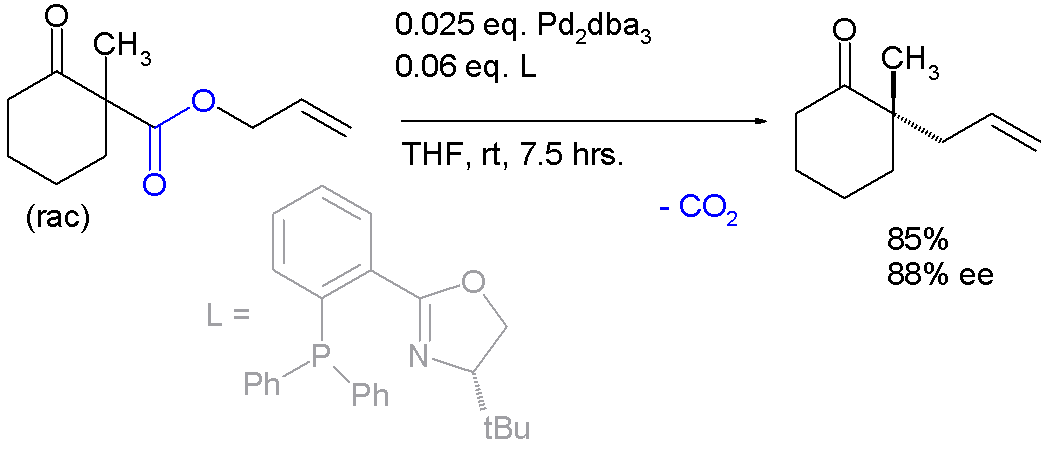
Asymmetric variation

The scope is extended to asymmetric α-alkylation of ketones masked as their enol carbonate esters:

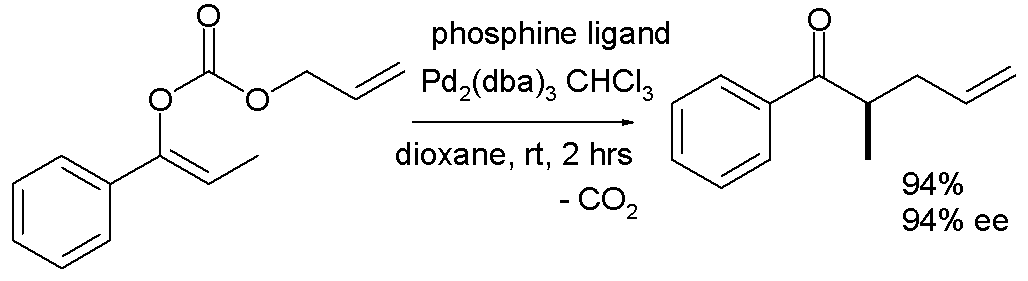
Decarboxylative Allylation Trost 2005
