= Claisen rearrangement =

Chemical reaction

| Named after | Rainer Ludwig Claisen |
| Reaction type | Rearrangement reaction |

Identifiers
| Organic Chemistry Portal | claisen-rearrangement |
| RSC ontology ID | RXNO:0000148 |

The Claisen rearrangement is a carbon–carbon bond-forming chemical reaction discovered by Rainer Ludwig Claisen. The heating of an allyl vinyl ether will initiate a [3,3]-sigmatropic rearrangement to give a γ,δ-unsaturated carbonyl, driven by exergonically favored carbonyl CO bond formation with Δ(Δ_{f}H) ca. −25 kcal/mol (−100 kJ/mol).

The Claisen rearrangement

== Mechanism ==
The Claisen rearrangement is an exothermic, concerted (bond cleavage and recombination) pericyclic reaction. Woodward–Hoffmann rules show a suprafacial, stereospecific reaction pathway. The kinetics are of the first order and the whole transformation proceeds through a highly ordered cyclic transition state and is intramolecular. Crossover experiments eliminate the possibility of the rearrangement occurring via an intermolecular reaction mechanism and are consistent with an intramolecular process.

There are substantial solvent effects observed in the Claisen rearrangement, where polar solvents tend to accelerate the reaction to a greater extent. Hydrogen-bonding solvents gave the highest rate constants. For example, ethanol/water solvent mixtures give rate constants 10-fold higher than sulfolane. Trivalent organoaluminium reagents, such as trimethylaluminium, have been shown to accelerate this reaction.

== Variations ==
=== Aromatic Claisen rearrangement ===
The first reported Claisen rearrangement is the [3,3]-sigmatropic rearrangement of an allyl phenyl ether to intermediate 1, which quickly tautomerizes to a 2-allylphenol.

The Claisen rearrangement can occur in domino fashion with a Cope rearrangement, in which case the allyl group appears to attack the para position on the ring:

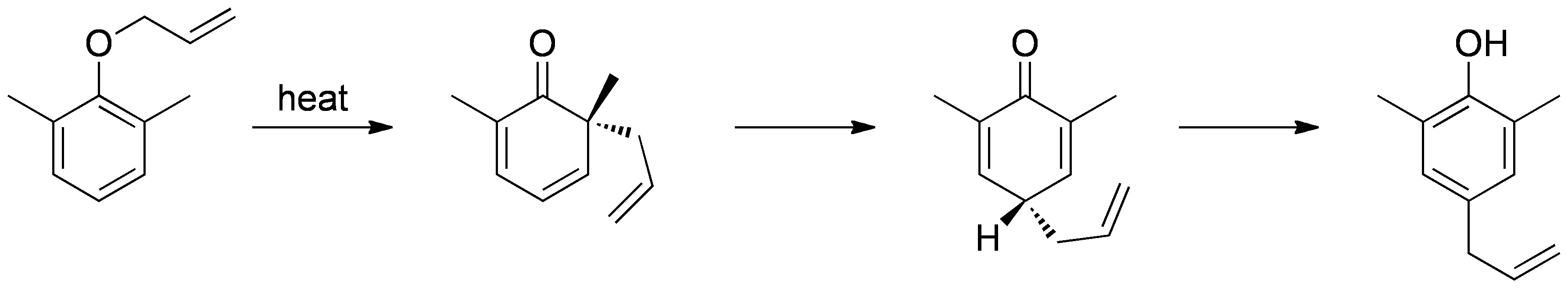
Aromatic Claisen with ortho-position substituted

Meta-substitution affects the regioselectivity of this rearrangement. For example, electron withdrawing groups (such as bromide) at the meta-position direct the rearrangement to the ortho-position (71% ortho product), while electron donating groups (such as methoxy), direct rearrangement to the para-position (69% para product). Additionally, presence of ortho substituents exclusively leads to para-substituted rearrangement products. If an aldehyde or carboxylic acid occupies the ortho or para positions, the allyl side-chain displaces the group, releasing it as carbon monoxide or carbon dioxide, respectively.

=== Bellus–Claisen rearrangement ===
The Bellus–Claisen rearrangement is the reaction of allylic ethers, amines, and thioethers with ketenes to give γ,δ-unsaturated esters, amides, and thioesters. This transformation was serendipitously observed by Bellus in 1979 through their synthesis of an intermediate to an insecticide, pyrethroid. Halogen substituted ketenes (R_{1}, R_{2}) are often used in this reaction for their high electrophilicity. Numerous reductive methods for the removal of the resulting α-haloesters, amides and thioesters have been developed. The Bellus-Claisen offers synthetic chemists a unique opportunity for ring expansion strategies.

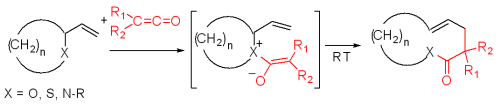
The Bellus–Claisen rearrangement

=== Eschenmoser–Claisen rearrangement ===
The Eschenmoser–Claisen rearrangement proceeds by heating allylic alcohols in the presence of N,N-dimethylacetamide dimethyl acetal to form a γ,δ-unsaturated amide. This was developed by Albert Eschenmoser in 1964. Eschenmoser-Claisen rearrangement was used as a key step in the total synthesis of morphine.

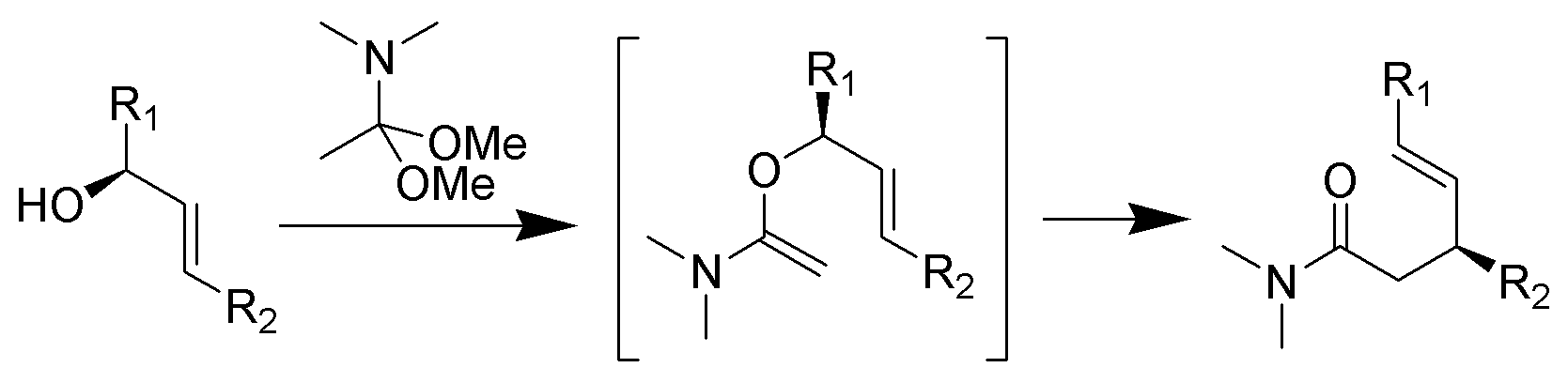
The Eschenmoser-Claisen rearrangement

Mechanism:

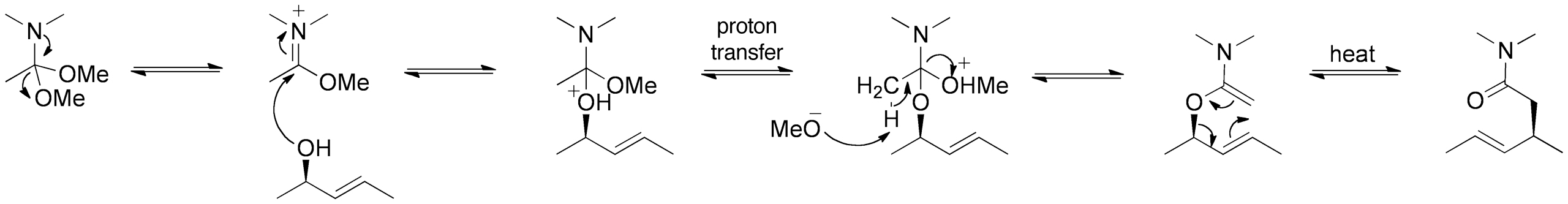
Eschenmoser–Claisen mechanism

=== Ireland–Claisen rearrangement ===
The Ireland–Claisen rearrangement is the reaction of an allylic carboxylate with a strong base (such as lithium diisopropylamide) to give a γ,δ-unsaturated carboxylic acid. The rearrangement proceeds via silylketene acetal, which is formed by trapping the lithium enolate with chlorotrimethylsilane. Like the Bellus-Claisen (above), Ireland-Claisen rearrangement can take place at room temperature and above. The E- and Z-configured silylketene acetals lead to anti and syn rearranged products, respectively. There are numerous examples of enantioselective Ireland-Claisen rearrangements found in literature to include chiral boron reagents and the use of chiral auxiliaries.

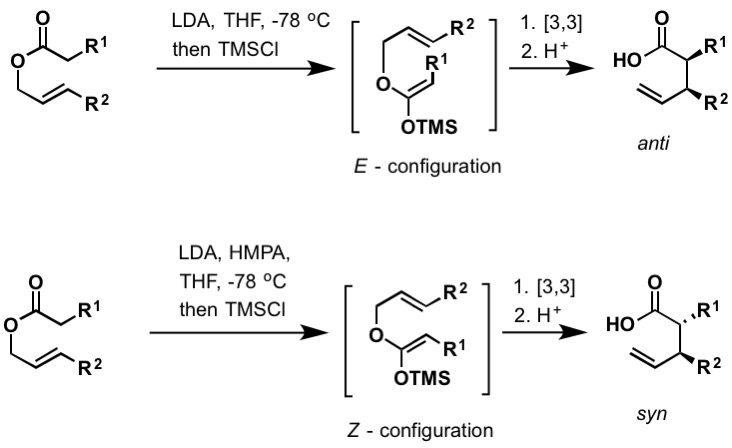
The Ireland–Claisen rearrangement

=== Johnson–Claisen rearrangement ===
The Johnson–Claisen rearrangement is the reaction of an allylic alcohol with an orthoester to yield a γ,δ-unsaturated ester. Weak acids, such as propionic acid, have been used to catalyze this reaction. This rearrangement often requires high temperatures (100–200 °C) and can take anywhere from 10 to 120 hours to complete. However, microwave assisted heating in the presence of KSF-clay or propionic acid have demonstrated dramatic increases in reaction rate and yields.

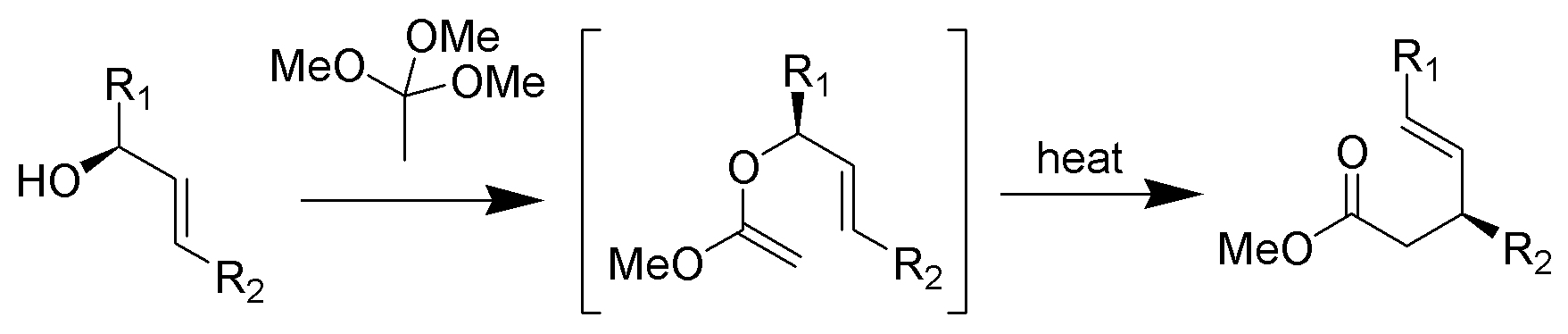
The Johnson–Claisen rearrangement

Mechanism:

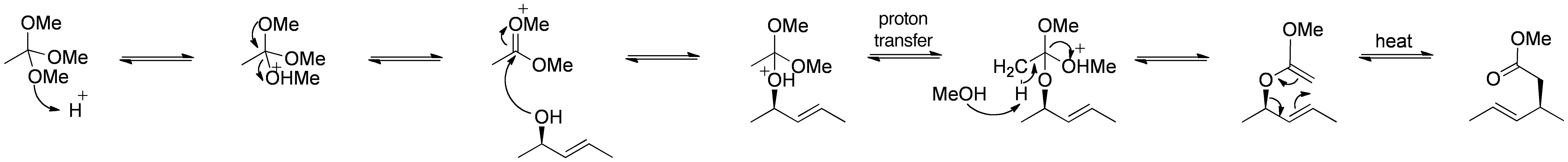
Johnson–Claisen mechanism

=== Kazmaier–Claisen rearrangement ===
The Kazmaier-Claisen rearrangement is the reaction of an unsaturated amino acid ester with a strong base (such as lithium diisopropylamide) and a metal salt at –78 °C to give a chelated enolate as intermediate. While different metal salts can be used to form the enolate, the use of zinc chloride results in the highest yield and gives the best stereospecificity. The enolate species rearranges at –20 °C to form an amino acid with an allylic side chain in α-position. This method was described by Uli Kazmaier in 1993.

The Kazmaier-Claisen rearrangement

=== Photo-Claisen rearrangement ===
The Claisen rearrangement of aryl ethers can also be performed as a photochemical reaction. In addition to the traditional ortho product obtained under thermal conditions (the [3,3] rearrangement product), the photochemical variation also gives the para product ([3,5] product), alternate isomers of the allyl group (for example, [1,3] and [1,5] products), and simple loss of the ether group, and even can rearrange alkyl ethers in addition to allyl ethers. The photochemical reaction occurs via a stepwise process of radical-cleavage followed by bond-formation rather than as a concerted pericyclic reaction, which therefore allows the opportunity for the greater variety of possible substrates and product isomers. The [1,3] and [1,5] results of the photo-Claisen rearrangement are analogous to the photo-Fries rearrangement of aryl esters and related acyl compounds.

== Hetero-Claisens ==
=== Aza–Claisen ===
An iminium can serve as one of the pi-bonded moieties in the rearrangement.

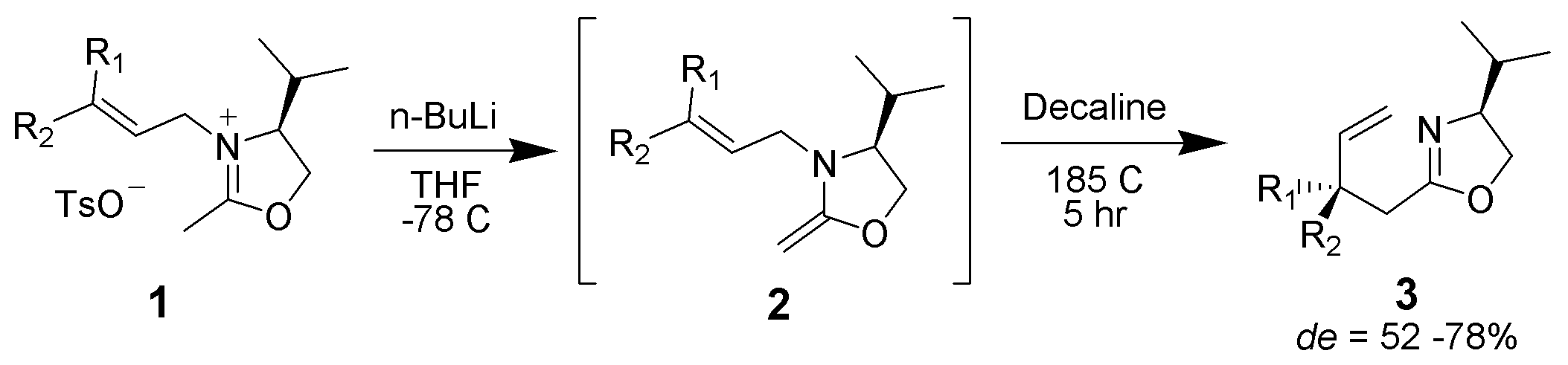
An example of the Aza–Claisen rearrangement

=== Thio–Claisen ===
The thio–Claisen rearrangement reacts an allyl vinyl sulfide with mercuric oxide.

=== Chen–Mapp reaction ===
The Chen–Mapp reaction, also known as the [3,3]-phosphorimidate rearrangement or Staudinger–Claisen reaction, installs a phosphite in the place of an alcohol and takes advantage of the Staudinger reduction to convert this to an allylic amine. The subsequent Claisen is driven by the fact that a P=O double bond is more energetically favorable than a P=N double bond.

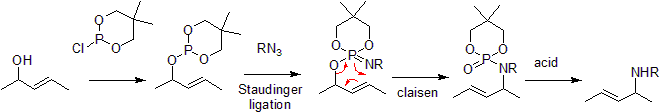
The Mapp reaction

=== Overman rearrangement ===
The Overman rearrangement (named after Larry Overman) is a Claisen rearrangement of allylic trichloroacetimidates to allylic trichloroacetamides.

The Overman rearrangement

The Overman rearrangement is applicable to the synthesis of vicinal diamino compounds from 1,2-vicinal allylic diols.

=== Zwitterionic Claisen rearrangement ===
Unlike typical Claisen rearrangements which require heating, zwitterionic Claisen rearrangements take place at or below room temperature. The acyl ammonium ions are highly selective for Z-enolates under mild conditions.

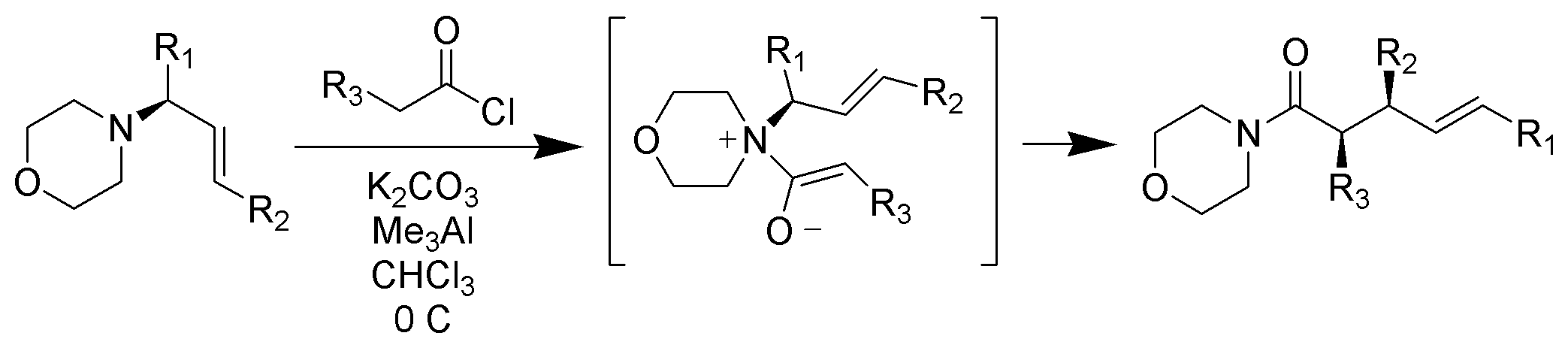
The zwitterionic Claisen rearrangement

== In nature ==
The enzyme chorismate mutase (EC 5.4.99.5) catalyzes the Claisen rearrangement of chorismate to prephenate, an intermediate in the biosynthetic pathway towards the synthesis of phenylalanine and tyrosine.

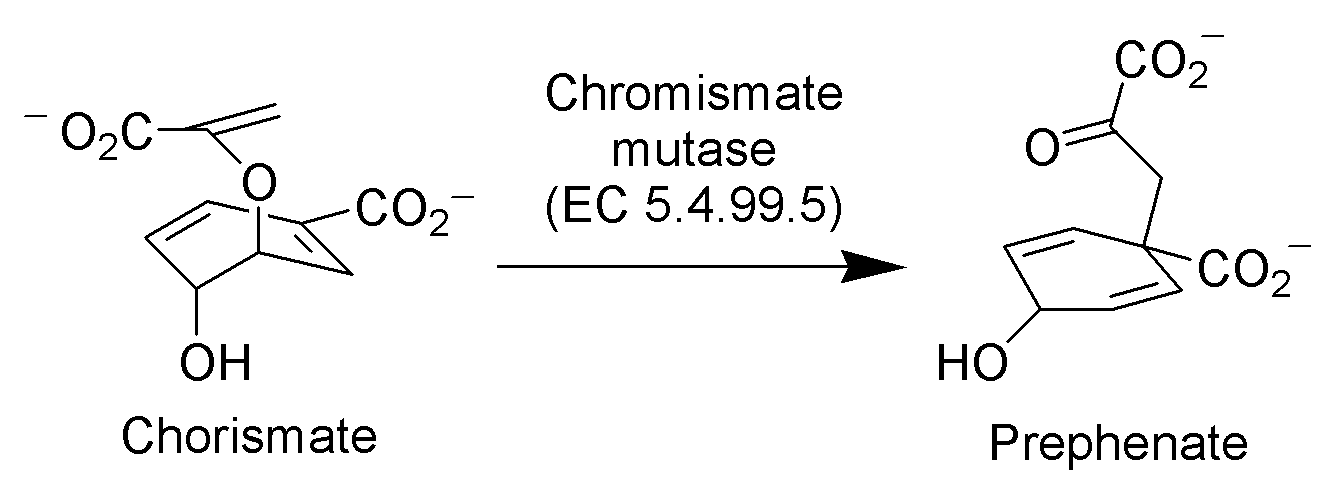
Chorismate mutase catalyzes a Claisen rearrangement

== History ==
Discovered in 1912, the Claisen rearrangement is the first recorded example of a [3,3]-sigmatropic rearrangement.

== See also ==
- Carroll rearrangement
- Cope rearrangement
