= Davis oxidation =

Chemical reaction

Named after	Franklin A. Davis
Reaction type	Organic redox reaction

Identifiers
Organic Chemistry Portal	davis-oxidation

In organic chemistry, the Davis oxidation or Davis' oxaziridine oxidation refers to oxidations involving the use of the Davis reagent (2-(phenylsulfonyl)-3-phenyloxaziridine) or other similar oxaziridine reagents. This reaction mainly refers to the generation of α-hydroxy carbonyl compounds (acyloins) from ketones or esters. The reaction is carried out in a basic environment to generate the corresponding enolate from the ketone or ester. This reaction has been shown to work for amides.

Other oxidations carried out by Davis' reagent include the oxidation of sulfides and selenides to sulfoxides and selenoxides without further oxidation; the oxidation of alkenes to epoxides; and the oxidation of amines to hydroxylamines and amine oxides.

== Mechanism ==
Regarding the α-hydroxylation of carbonyls, the base first converts the ketone or ester into its corresponding enolate. Then, the enolate anion as a nucleophile attacks the oxygen atom of the oxaziridine in a S_{N}2 mechanism, forming a hemiaminal intermediate. The intermediate then fragments into a sulfinimine, and, after protonation, the desired α-hydroxyketone or α-hydroxyester.

== See also ==
- Rubottom oxidation - also produces α-hydroxy carbonyl compounds
