= N-Sulfinyl imine =

Class of chemical compounds

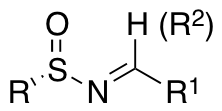
Sulfinimine

N-Sulfinyl imines (N-sulfinylimines, sulfinimines, thiooxime S-oxides) are a class of imines bearing a sulfinyl group attached to nitrogen. These imines display useful stereoselectivity reactivity and due to the presence of the chiral electron withdrawing N-sulfinyl group. They allow 1,2-addition of organometallic reagents to imines. The N-sulfinyl group exerts powerful and predictable stereodirecting effects resulting in high levels of asymmetric induction. Racemization of the newly created carbon-nitrogen stereo center is prevented because anions are stabilized at nitrogen (i.e., the sulfinyl group is a versatile amine protection group). The sulfinyl chiral auxiliary is readily removed by simple acid hydrolysis. The addition of organometallic reagents to N-sulfinyl imines is the most reliable and versatile method for the asymmetric synthesis of amine derivatives. These building blocks have been employed in the asymmetric synthesis of numerous biologically active compounds.

== Synthesis ==
The first N-sulfinyl imines in racemic form were formed by oxidation of p-toluene-sulfenyl imines with m-CPBA. Enantiopure p-toluene-sulfinyl imines arise by the reaction of the commercially available Andersen reagent (menthyl p-toluenesulfinate) with metallo-ketimines but is limited to ketone derived N-sulfinyl imines. A more general method for the preparation of N-sulfinyl imines is the asymmetric oxidation of achiral sulfenyl imines with a chiral oxaziridine. The utility of this method is limited by the availability of the N-sulfonyloxaziridine, which is difficult to prepare. More practical is the one-pot procedure from the Andersen reagent making a variety of p-toluene-sulfinyl imines available from both aromatic and aliphatic aldehydes.

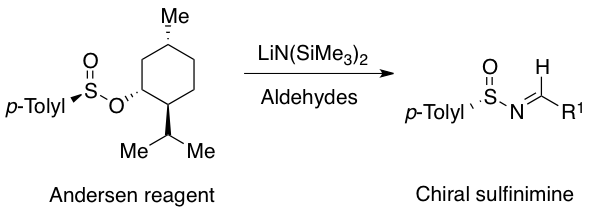

A widely used method for the asymmetric synthesis of N-sulfinyl imines is the condensation of enantiopure primary sulfinamides with aldehyde or ketones. A mild Lewis acid dehydrating reagents such as titanium ethoxide facilitate the condensation. Many sulfinamides are commercially available in both (R)- and (S)-forms. The two most commonly used are the Davis p-toluene-sulfinamide and the Ellman tert-butanesulfinamide

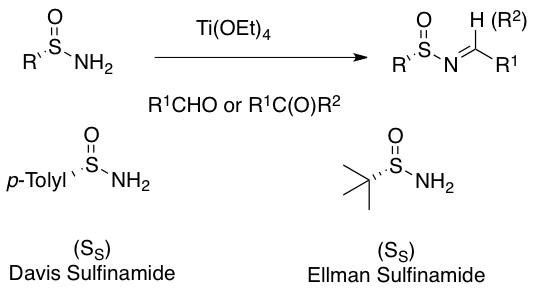

== Applications ==
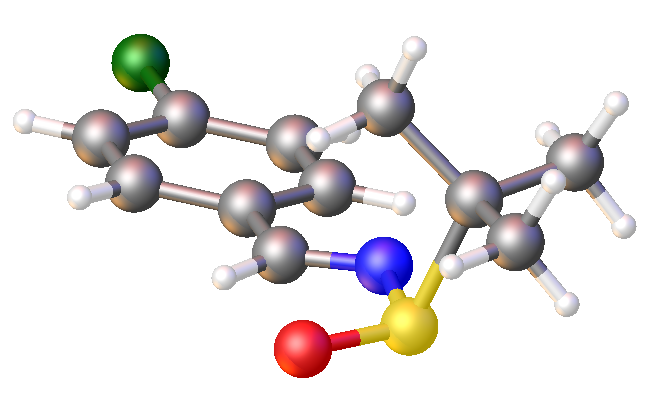
Structure of 4-ClC_{6}H_{4}CH=NS(O)Bu-t. Selected distances: d_{S=O} = 147.5, d_{N=C} = 127.5, d_{S-N} = 170.4 pm. Color scheme: red = O, blue = N, green = Cl, gray = C, white = H, yellow = S.

The p-toluene-sulfinyl imines have been used for the highly diastereoselective asymmetric synthesis of α-amino acids, β-amino acids, syn- and anti-2,3-diamino esters, α-amino aldehydes and ketones, β-amino ketones, α-amino phosphonates, aziridine 2-carboxylates, and aziridine 2-phosphonates. Many of these same transformations can be carried out with tert-butylsulfinyl imines. For the asymmetric synthesis of amines, tert-butylsulfinyl imines are required as lithium and Grignard reagents react at the sulfinyl sulfur in p-toluene-sulfinyl imines. Mild acid treatment readily removes the N-sulfinyl group in the sulfinamide products affording the free amine derivatives. An advantage of tert-butylsulfinyl imines is that acid treatment of the corresponding sulfinamides leads to easily removal by-products

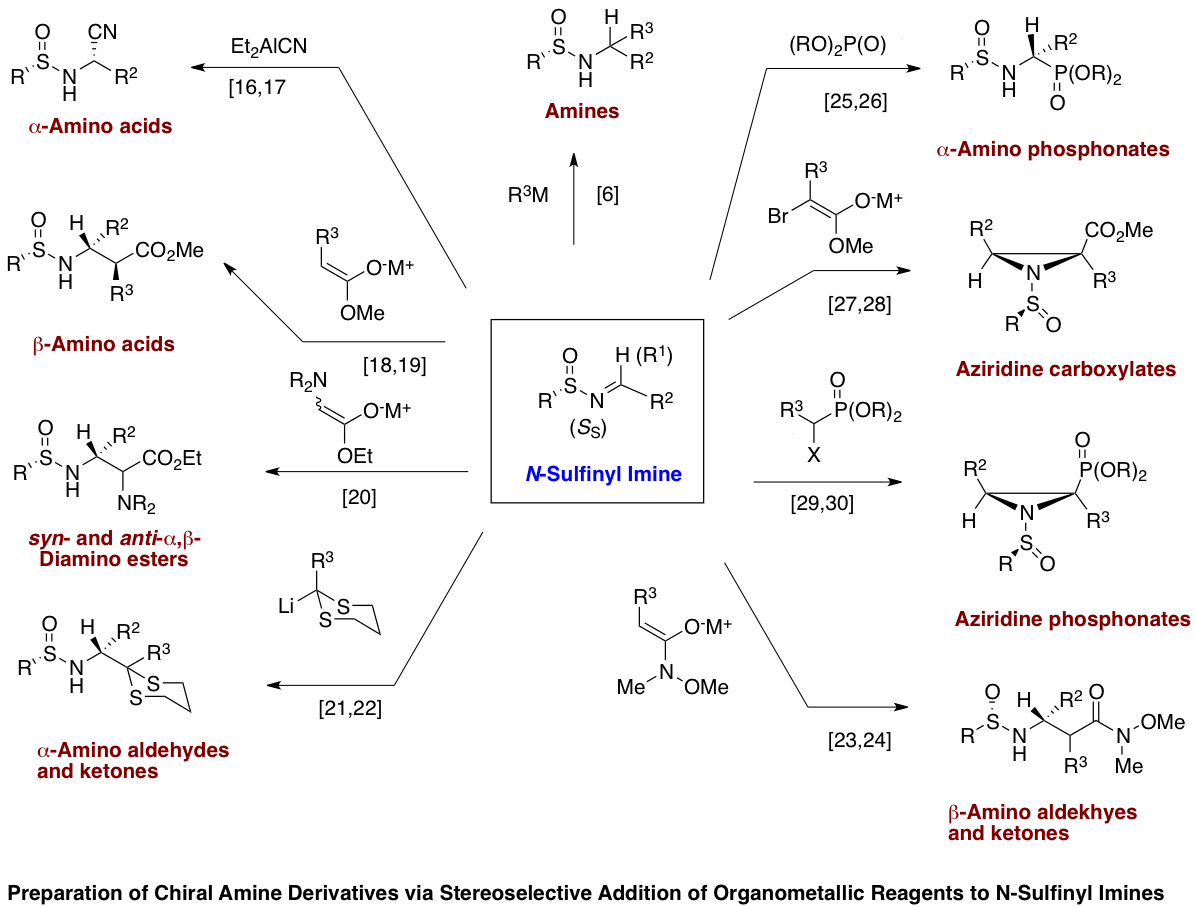
