= MOOP =

Moop or MOOP may refer to:

- Medal "For Impeccable Service", in the Soviet Armed Forces
- MOOP (electrical safety), a concept found in the standard for medical electrical equipment IEC 60601-1
- A term for negative emotions on the cartoon series Bravest Warriors
- "Matter Out Of Place", a neologism for trash used by Burning Man attendees
- Maximum Out-of-Pocket, a term used in the health insurance marketplace
- A fictional band from the episode "Christian Rock Hard" of South Park

== See also ==
- MoOPH, oxodiperoxymolybdenum(pyridine)-(hexamethylphosphoric triamide)
