= Franklin A. Davis =

American chemist

Franklin Arnold Davis (born April 1, 1939) is the Laura H. Carnell Professor of Chemistry at Temple University in Philadelphia, Pennsylvania. He is most notable for his development of sulfur-nitrogen reagents including N-sulfonyloxaziridine for oxidations and asymmetric hydroxylations and N-sulfinyl imines for the asymmetric synthesis of chiral amine derivatives. The reagents are commonly called Davis oxaziridines and Davis sulfinamides, respectively. Davis oxidation and Davis' reagent are both named after him.

== Biography ==
Davis was born in Des Moines, Iowa. Davis earned his B.S. from University of Wisconsin–Madison in 1962 and completed his PhD at Syracuse University with Donald C. Dittmer in 1966.

After completing a post-doctoral appointment at University of Texas at Austin with Michael J. S. Dewar, he took up a job at Drexel University in 1968. There he served as George S. Sasin Professor of Chemistry until 1995, and moved across town to Temple University.

Davis has won the American Chemical Society Arthur C. Cope Scholar Award (2006), the John Scott Medal (2006), and the Paul G. Gassman award (2012).
