= Tert-Butanesulfinamide =

tert-Butanesulfinamide
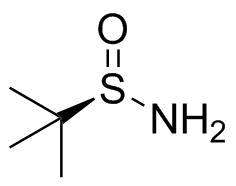
(R)-tert-butylsulfinamide
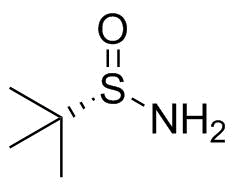
(S)-tert-butylsulfinamide
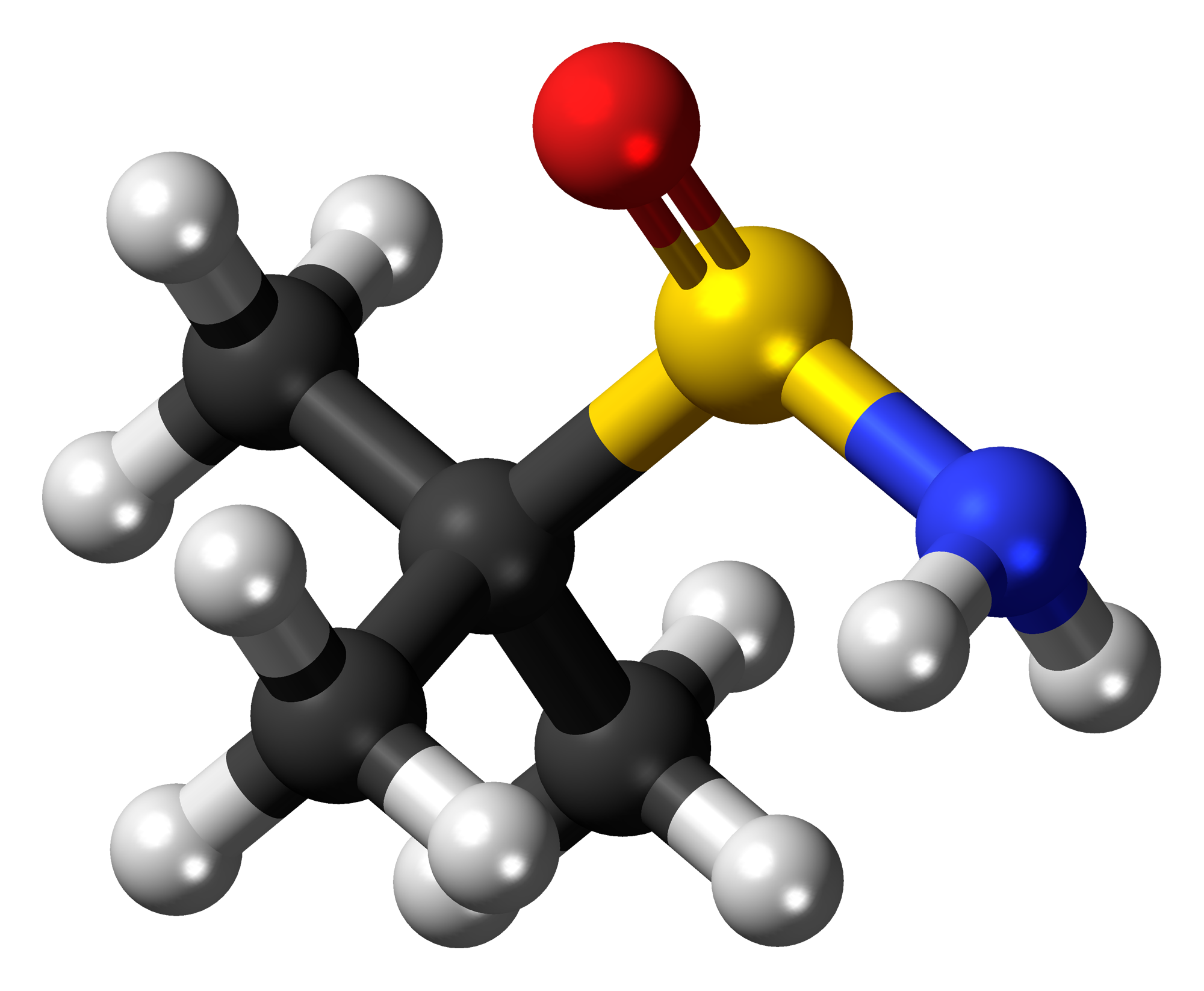

Names
- Preferred IUPAC name 2-Methylpropane-2-sulfinamide

Identifiers
CAS Number	146374-27-8 (R/S); 196929-78-9 (R)-(+); 343338-28-3 (S)-(-)
3D model (JSmol)	(R/S): Interactive image; (R)-(+): Interactive image; (S)-(-): Interactive image
ChemSpider	2627606
ECHA InfoCard	100.108.188
PubChem CID	3382465 (R/S); 10964479 (R)-(+); 11355477 (S)-(-)
UNII	42F4K704G0 (R/S); 7FEC1T720F (R)-(+); I85YC2ZA8O (S)-(-)
CompTox Dashboard (EPA)	DTXSID90463241 DTXSID20391967, DTXSID90463241
- InChI: (R/S): InChI=1S/C4H11NOS/c1-4(2,3)7(5)6/h5H2,1-3H3 Key: CESUXLKAADQNTB-UHFFFAOYSA-N; (R)-(+): InChI=1S/C4H11NOS/c1-4(2,3)7(5)6/h5H2,1-3H3/t7-/m1/s1 Key: CESUXLKAADQNTB-SSDOTTSWSA-N; (S)-(-): InChI=1S/C4H11NOS/c1-4(2,3)7(5)6/h5H2,1-3H3/t7-/m0/s1 Key: CESUXLKAADQNTB-ZETCQYMHSA-N
- SMILES: (R/S): O=S(N)C(C)(C)C; (R)-(+): O=[S@@](N)C(C)(C)C; (S)-(-): O=[S@](N)C(C)(C)C

Properties
Chemical formula	(CH_{3})_{3}CS(O)NH_{2}
Molar mass	121.20 g/mol
Appearance	white to off-white crystalline solid
Melting point	102 to 105 °C (216 to 221 °F; 375 to 378 K)
- Except where otherwise noted, data are given for materials in their standard state (at 25 °C [77 °F], 100 kPa). verify (what is ?) Infobox references

tert-Butanesulfinamide (also known as 2-methyl-2-propanesulfinamide or Ellman's sulfinamide) is an organosulfur compound and a member of the class of sulfinamides. Both enantiomeric forms are commercially available and are used in asymmetric synthesis as chiral auxiliaries, often as chiral ammonia equivalents for the synthesis of amines. tert-Butanesulfinamide and the associated synthetic methodology was introduced in 1997 by Jonathan A. Ellman et al.

== Enantiopure synthesis ==
Enantiopure tert-butanesulfinamide can be prepared by enantioselective oxidation of inexpensive di-tert-butyl disulfide to the thiosulfinate followed by disulfide bond cleavage by lithium amide. In the original scope the chiral ligand used together with vanadyl acetylacetonate was prepared by condensing an optically pure chiral aminoindanol with 3,5-di-tert-butyl salicylaldehyde.

Tert-butanesulfinamide synthesis

tert-Butanesulfinamide synthesis

== Enantioselective amine synthesis ==
Condensation with ketones and aldehydes yields the corresponding N-tert-butanesulfinyl aldimines and ketimines. These intermediates are more resistant to hydrolysis than other imines but more reactive towards nucleophiles. A nucleophile adds diastereoselectively over the imine group in an electrophilic addition with the tert-butanesulfinyl group acting as a chiral auxiliary. This tert-butanesulfinyl group is also a protecting group. On addition of hydrochloric acid the tert-butanesulfinyl group is removed, forming the chiral primary ammonium salt or amine (from aldehyde precursor) or the chiral secondary amine (ketone precursor).

Tert-butanesulfinamide chiral amine synthesis

tert-Butanesulfinamide chiral amine synthesis

Typical nucleophiles are Grignard reagents, organozinc compounds, organolithium compounds, and enolates.

Chiral sulfinimines as intermediates for the asymmetric synthesis of amines have also been developed by Franklin A. Davis.

== Applications ==
tert-Butanesulfinamide has been used as an auxiliary in an asymmetric synthesis of cetirizine (more potent than the racemic mixture of the drug) starting from p-chlorobenzaldehyde and phenylmagnesium bromide.

Asymmetric sulfinamide cetirizine synthesis

Asymmetric cetirizine synthesis
