= Sulfinyl halide =

Class of chemical compounds

Methanesulfinyl chloride

Sulfinyl halide have the general formula R−S(O)−X, where X is a halogen. They are intermediate in oxidation level between sulfenyl halides, R−S−X, and sulfonyl halides, R−SO_{2}−X. The best known examples are sulfinyl chlorides, thermolabile, moisture-sensitive compounds, which are useful intermediates for preparation of other sufinyl derivatives such as sulfinamides, sulfinates, sulfoxides, and thiosulfinates. Unlike the sulfur atom in sulfonyl halides and sulfenyl halides, the sulfur atom in sulfinyl halides is chiral, as shown for methanesulfinyl chloride.

== Sulfinyl chlorides ==
Sulfinic acid chlorides, or sulfinyl chlorides, are sulfinyl halides with the general formula R−S(O)−Cl. Methanesulfinyl chloride, CH_{3}S(O)Cl, is prepared by chlorination of dimethyl disulfide to give CH_{3}SCl_{3}, which is treated with acetic anhydride. It is a straw-colored liquid. Arylsulfinyl chlorides are prepared by Friedel-Crafts reaction with thionyl chloride, or comproportionation of an arylsulfonate with the same. For example, toluenesulfinyl chloride is prepared by treating sodium tosylate with thionyl chloride. Also a straw-colored liquid, it boils near 100 °C at 0.5 mm Hg.

A general approach to the formation of sulfinyl chlorides is by reaction of the corresponding thiol with sulfuryl chloride, SO_{2}Cl_{2}; in cases where the sulfenyl chloride, RSCl, results instead, a trifluoroperacetic acid oxidation affords the desired product, as in the case of 2,2,2-trifluoro-1,1-diphenylethanethiol:

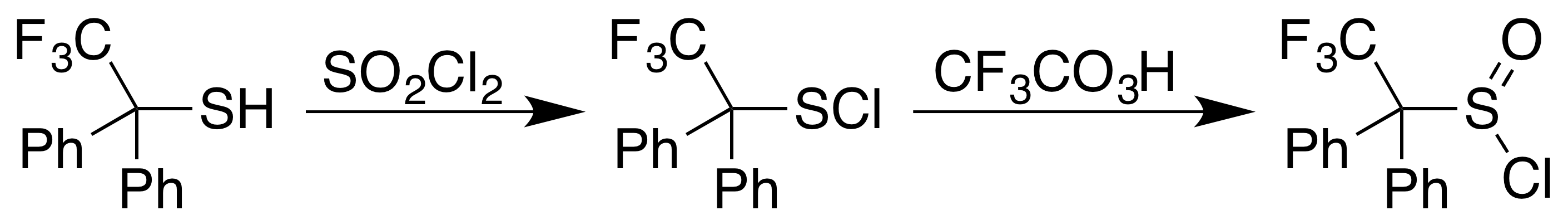

== Reactions ==
These compounds react readily with nucleophiles like water, alcohols, amines, thiols, and Grignard reagents. If the nucleophile is water the product is a sulfinic acid, if it is an alcohol the product is a sulfinic ester, if it is a primary or secondary amine the product is a sulfinamide, if it is a thiol the product is a thiosulfinate, while if it is a Grignard reagent the product is a sulfoxide. Because of their reactivity and instability, alkanesulfinyl chlorides are generally used without purification immediately after their synthesis. Storage is not recommended since pressure develops within the container due to hydrogen chloride release.

Treatment of alkanesulfinyl chlorides having α-hydrogens with tertiary amine bases gives thiocarbonyl S-oxides (sulfines) as isolable compounds. Thus, treatment of n-propanesulfinyl chloride with triethylamine gives syn-propanethial-S-oxide, the lachrymatory agent of the onion. Treatment of methanesulfinyl chloride or ethane-1,2-bis-sulfinyl chloride, ClS(O)CH_{2}CH_{2}S(O)Cl (prepared by oxidative chlorination of 1,2-ethanedithiol, HSCH_{2}CH_{2}SH), with a tertiary amine in the presence of the chiral glucose-derived secondary alcohol diacetone-D-glucose affords optically pure sulfinate esters by a process of Dynamic kinetic resolution. Sulfinyl chlorides undergo Friedel–Crafts reactions with arenes giving sulfoxides.

== Sulfinyl fluorides, bromides, and iodides ==
Room temperature hydrolysis of CF_{3}SF_{3} gives the sulfinyl fluoride CF_{3}S(O)F in a few hours in quantitative yield. Treatment of CF_{3}S(O)F with hydrogen bromide at −78 °C gives the sulfinyl bromide CF_{3}S(O)Br, which is unstable at room temperature and readily disproportionates. Sulfinyl iodides are apparently unknown compounds.
