= Edwin Vedejs =

Latvian-American professor of chemistry

- Edvīns Vedējs
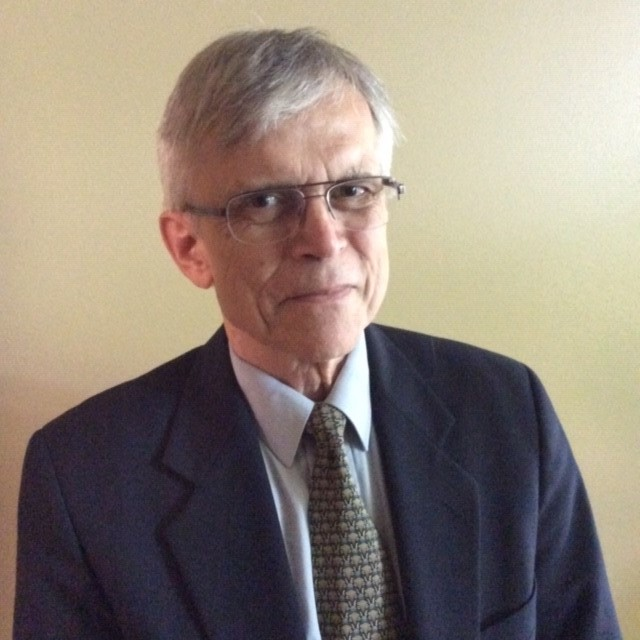
- Born: January 31, 1941; Riga, Latvia
- Died: December 2, 2017 (aged 76); Madison, Wisconsin, US
- Education: University of Michigan (B.S.) University of Wisconsin (Ph.D.)
- Known for: mechanistic study of the Wittig reaction, MoOPH, sulfur mediated ring expansions, chiral Lewis bases
- Scientific career
- Fields: Organic Chemistry
- Workplaces: University of Wisconsin, University of Michigan
- Doctoral advisor: Hans Muxfeldt
- Doctoral students: Olafs Daugulis
- Other notable students: Anthony Czarnik

Edwin Vedejs (/vɛˈdeɪz/) (Latvian: Edvīns Vedējs; January 31, 1941 – December 2, 2017) was a Latvian-American professor of chemistry. In 1967, he joined the organic chemistry faculty at University of Wisconsin. He rose through the ranks during his 32 years at Wisconsin being named Helfaer Professor (1991–1996) and Robert M. Bock Professor (1997–1998). In 1999, he moved to the University of Michigan and served as the Moses Gomberg Collegiate Professor of Chemistry for the final 13 years of his tenure. He was elected a fellow of the American Chemical Society in 2011. After his retirement in 2011, the University of Michigan established the Edwin Vedejs Collegiate Professor of Chemistry Chair. Vedejs died on December 2, 2017, in Madison, Wisconsin.

== Early life and education ==
Edwin "Ed" Vedejs was born in Riga, Latvia to Velta (nee Robežnieks) and Nikolajs Vedējs. Not long after his birth, the German occupation of Latvia during World War II occurred followed by the Soviet re-occupation of Latvia in 1944. These events forced his family to settle in the Fischbach Displaced Persons camp in Germany for six years. In 1950, they emigrated to the United States and first settled in Fort Atkinson, WI. They eventually moved to Grand Rapids, MI.

He attended Grand Rapids Junior College for a few years before transferring to the University of Michigan where he received a BS degree in 1962. He moved to the University of Wisconsin and joined the group of Professor Hans Muxfeldt for his Ph.D. studies (Progress toward the total synthesis of terramycin), which he completed in 1966. From 1966–67, he did post-doctoral research on the total synthesis of prostaglandins at Harvard University in the laboratory of Nobel Laureate Professor E. J. Corey.

== Research ==
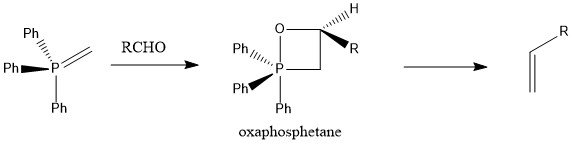
A Wittig reaction between an aldehyde and a phosphorane to give an olefin through an oxaphosphetane intermediate

Vedejs' main areas of research focus included organic synthesis methodologies and reaction mechanisms. His group targeted the synthesis of several natural products, such as retronecine, mitomycin, and cytochalasin, but the completion of a total synthesis was always secondary to the main goal of exploring new methodologies. His mechanistic research of the Wittig reaction revealed the importance of the oxaphosphetane. The application of heteroatoms such as nitrogen, sulfur, phosphorus, boron, silicon and tin were often prominently featured, which has been summarized in his self-penned account of his work. Vedejs also tackled a wide range of methodologies aimed at stereoselective synthesis including protonation of carbanions, acylation and alkylation of achiral and prochiral nucleophiles, parallel kinetic resolution, and control of configuration by crystallization-induced asymmetric transformation.

Over the course of his career, Vedejs published over 230 peer-reviewed articles. He served as an associate editor of the Journal of the American Chemical Society from 1994 to 1999, as chair of the NIH Medicinal Chemistry Study Section from 1990 to 1991, as chair of the Organic Division of the American Chemical Society in 2003, and as a member of the Organic Syntheses Board of Editors from 1980 to 1988. He served as editor (along with Scott E. Denmark) of the three volume series Lewis Base Catalysis in Organic Synthesis. Over the course of his 45 years in academia, he mentored over 80 doctoral students, and numerous post-doctoral fellows and undergraduates.

== Awards and honors ==
- Alfred P. Sloan Research Fellowship, 1971–1973
- Alexander von Humboldt Senior Scientist Award, 1984
- Member of the Latvian Academy of Sciences, 1992
- Paul Walden Medal, 1997
- Herbert C. Brown Award for Creative Research in Synthetic Methods, 2004
- Grand Medal of the Latvian Academy of Sciences, 2005
- Order of the Three Stars, Republic of Latvia, 2006
- Elected fellow of the American Chemical Society, 2011

== Selected publications ==
- Vedejs E, Peterson, MJ (1994). "Stereochemistry and Mechanism in the Wittig Reaction". Topics in Stereochemistry. Vol. 21. pp. 1–157. doi:10.1002/9780470147306.ch1. ISBN 9780470147306.
- Vedejs E, Diver ST (1 April 1993). "Tributylphosphine: a remarkable acylation catalyst". Journal of the American Chemical Society. 115 (8): 3358–3359. Bibcode:1993JAChS.115.3358V. doi:10.1021/ja00061a056.
- Vedejs E, Daugulis O, Diver ST (26 January 1996). "Enantioselective Acylations Catalyzed by Chiral Phosphines". The Journal of Organic Chemistry. 61 (2): 430–431. doi:10.1021/jo951661v. PMID 11666951.
- Vedejs E, Jure M (2005). "Efficiency in Nonenzymatic Kinetic Resolution". Angewandte Chemie International Edition. 44 (26): 3974–4001. doi:10.1002/anie.200460842. PMID 15942973.
- Vedejs E, Chapman RW, Fields SC, Lin S, Schrimpf MR (1995). "Conversion of Arylboronic Acids into Potassium Aryltrifluoroborates: Convenient Precursors of Arylboron Difluoride Lewis Acids". The Journal of Organic Chemistry. 60 (10): 3020–3027. doi:10.1021/jo00115a016.
