= Oxaphosphetane =

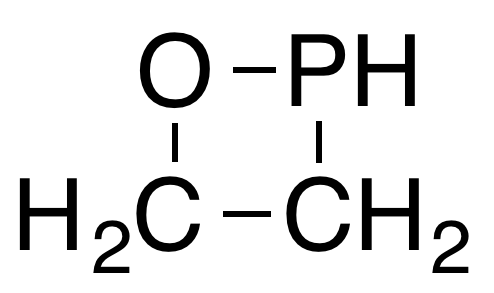
1,2-Oxaphosphetane
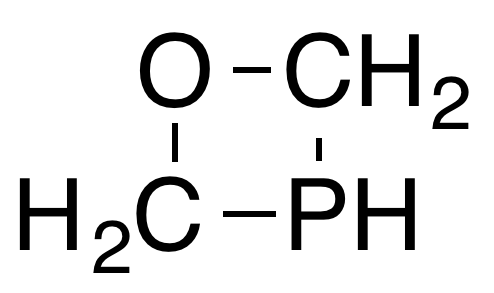
1,3-Oxaphosphetane
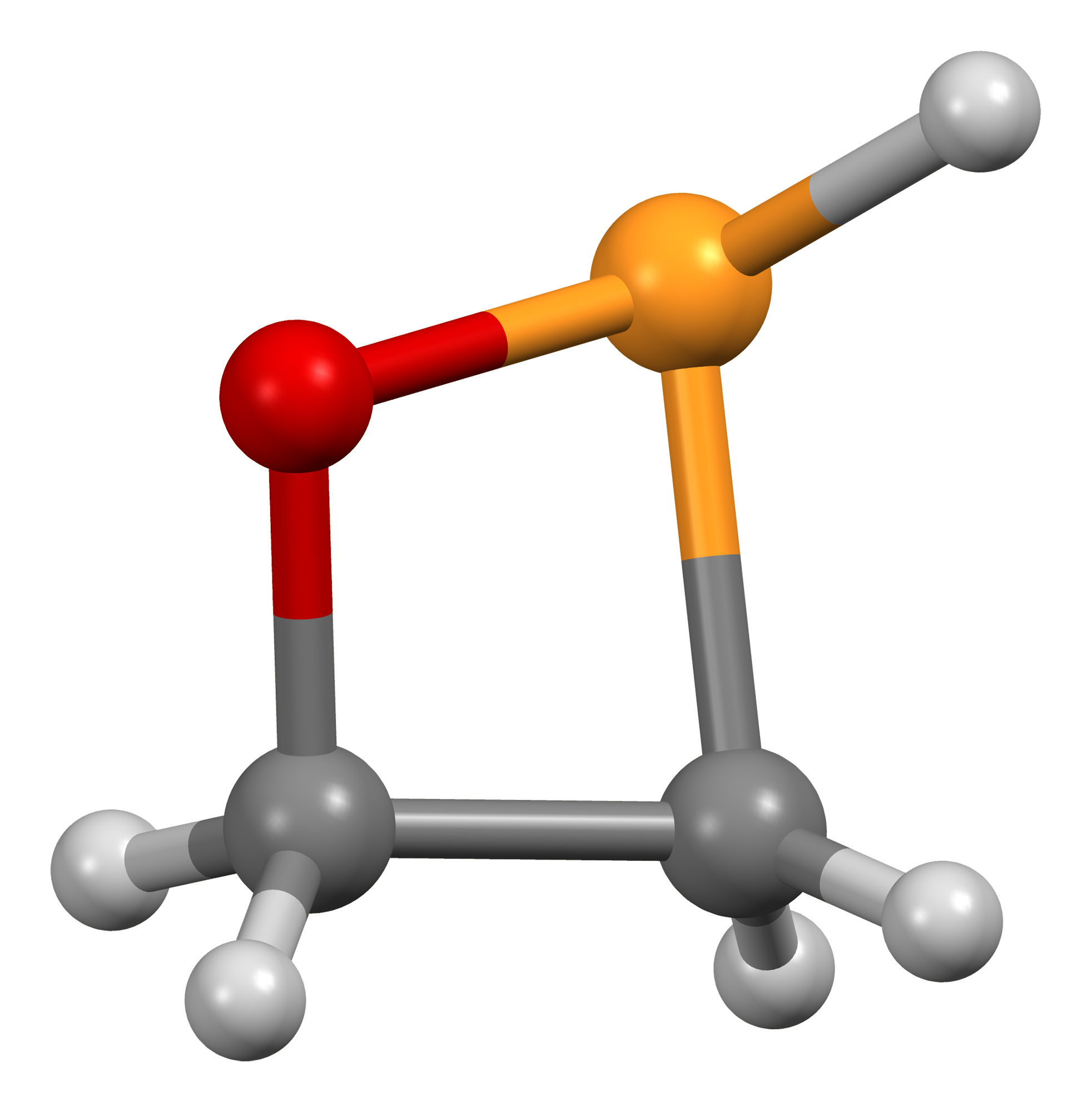
Ball-and-stick model of 1,2-oxaphosphetane
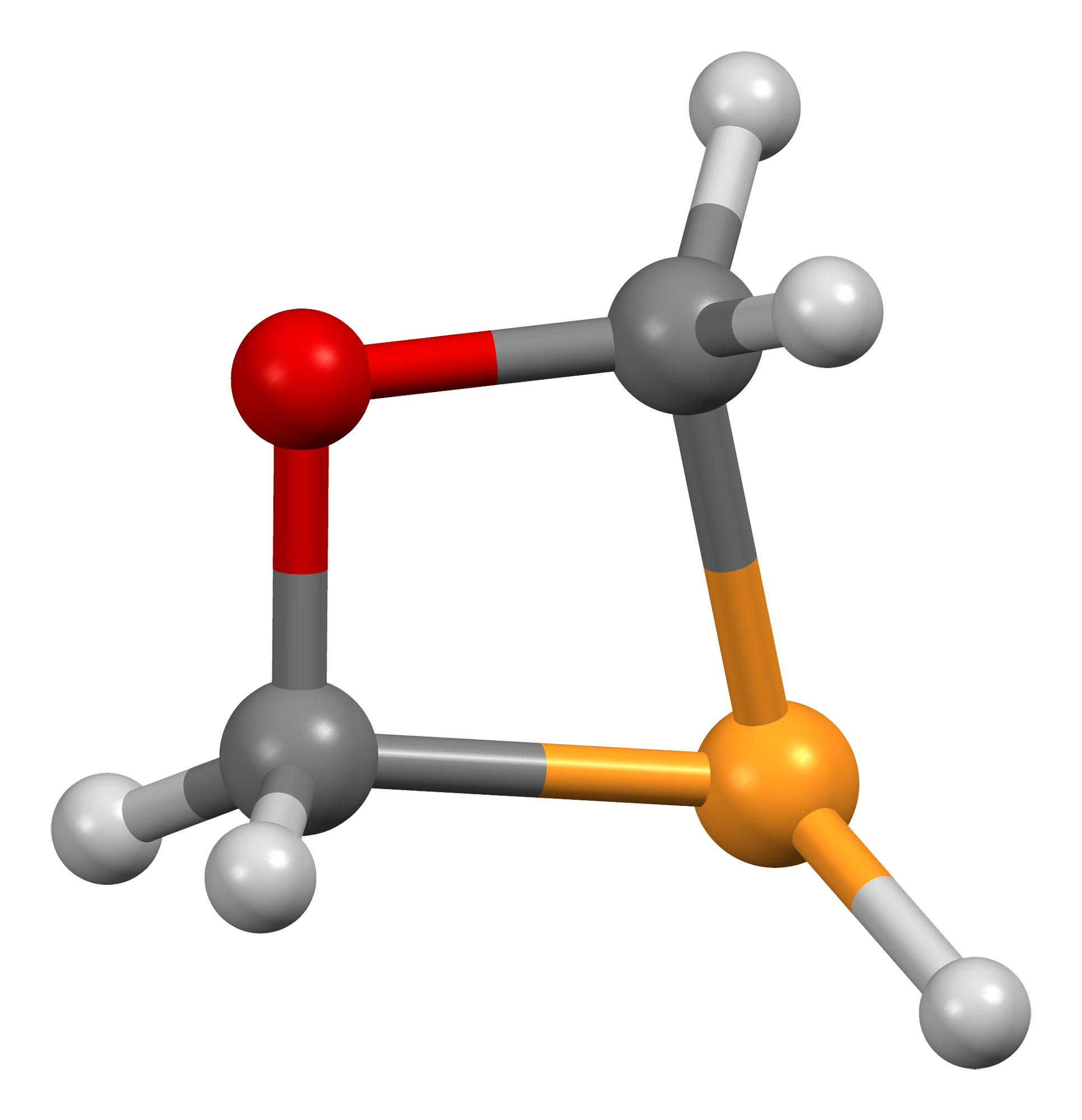
Ball-and-stick model of 1,3-oxaphosphetane

Names
- Other names 1,2-Oxaphosphetane; 1,3-Oxaphosphetane

Identifiers
CAS Number	1,2: 287-36-5; 1,3: 25885-35-2
3D model (JSmol)	1,2: Interactive image; 1,3: Interactive image
ChemSpider	1,2: 14123776
PubChem CID	1,2: 23373974; 1,3: 20362213
CompTox Dashboard (EPA)	1,2: DTXSID90633467
- InChI: 1,2: InChI=1S/C2H5OP/c1-2-4-3-1/h4H,1-2H2 Key: JONKIUBSNSUGGZ-UHFFFAOYSA-N; 1,3: InChI=1S/C2H5OP/c1-3-2-4-1/h4H,1-2H2 Key: XIEBRVIWJYCCCK-UHFFFAOYSA-N
- SMILES: 1,2: C1CPO1; 1,3: C1OCP1

Properties
Chemical formula	C_{2}H_{5}OP
Molar mass	76.035 g·mol^{−1}
- Except where otherwise noted, data are given for materials in their standard state (at 25 °C [77 °F], 100 kPa). Infobox references

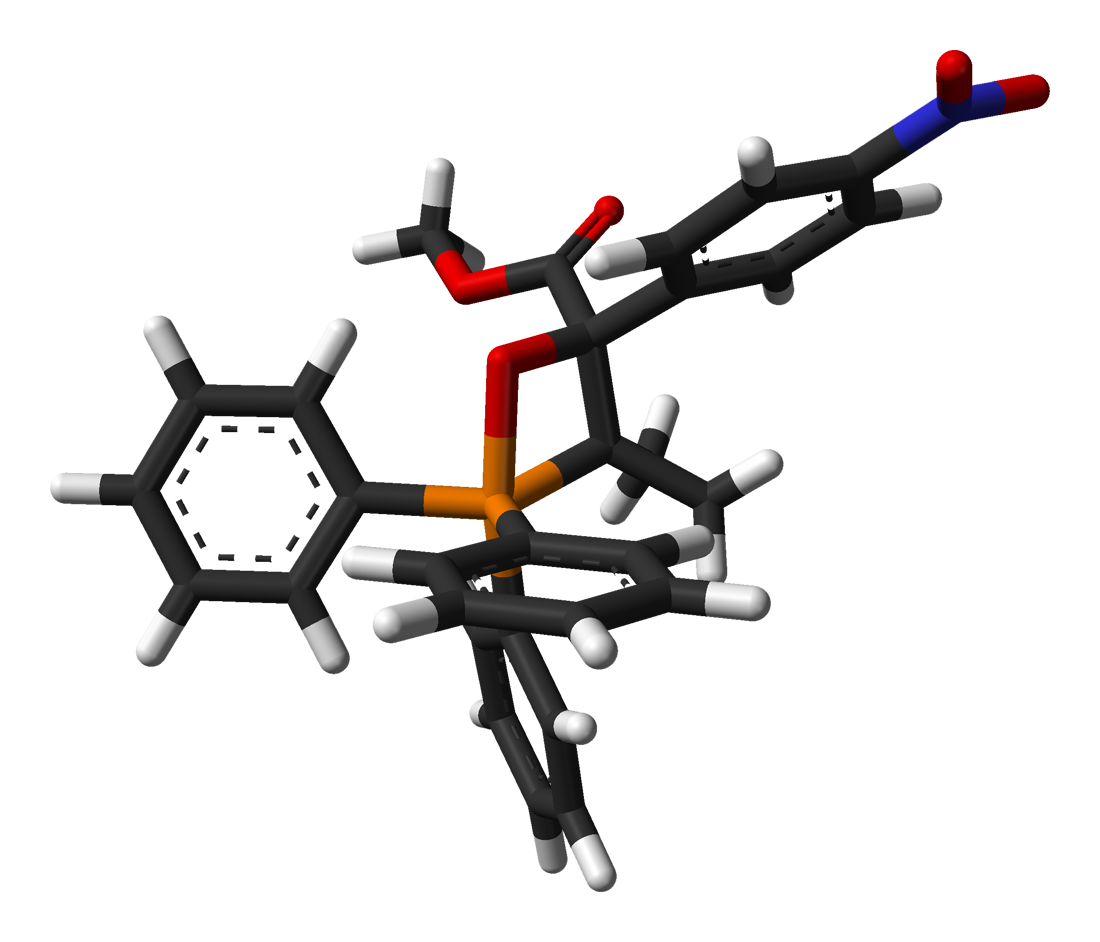
Stick model of a 1,2-oxaphosphetane that has been isolated and characterised by X-ray crystallography.

An oxaphosphetane is a molecule containing a four-membered ring with one phosphorus, one oxygen and two carbon atoms. In a 1,2-oxaphosphetane phosphorus is bonded directly to oxygen, whereas a 1,3-oxaphosphetane has the phosphorus and oxygen atoms at opposite corners.

1,2-Oxaphosphetanes are rarely isolated but are important intermediates in the Wittig reaction and related reactions such as the Seyferth–Gilbert homologation and the Horner–Wadsworth–Emmons reaction. Edwin Vedejs's NMR studies first revealed the importance of oxaphosphetanes in the mechanism of the Wittig reaction in the 1970s.

In 2005 the first isolation of 1,2-Oxaphosphetanes (typical Wittig intermediates) was reported. One of the compounds was characterized by X-ray crystallography and NMR. Although relatively stable, thermal decomposition of these oxaphosphetanes gave a phosphonium salt, which slowly dissociated to the Wittig reaction starting materials, the carbonyl and olefin compounds.
