= Oxaziridine =

Chemical compound

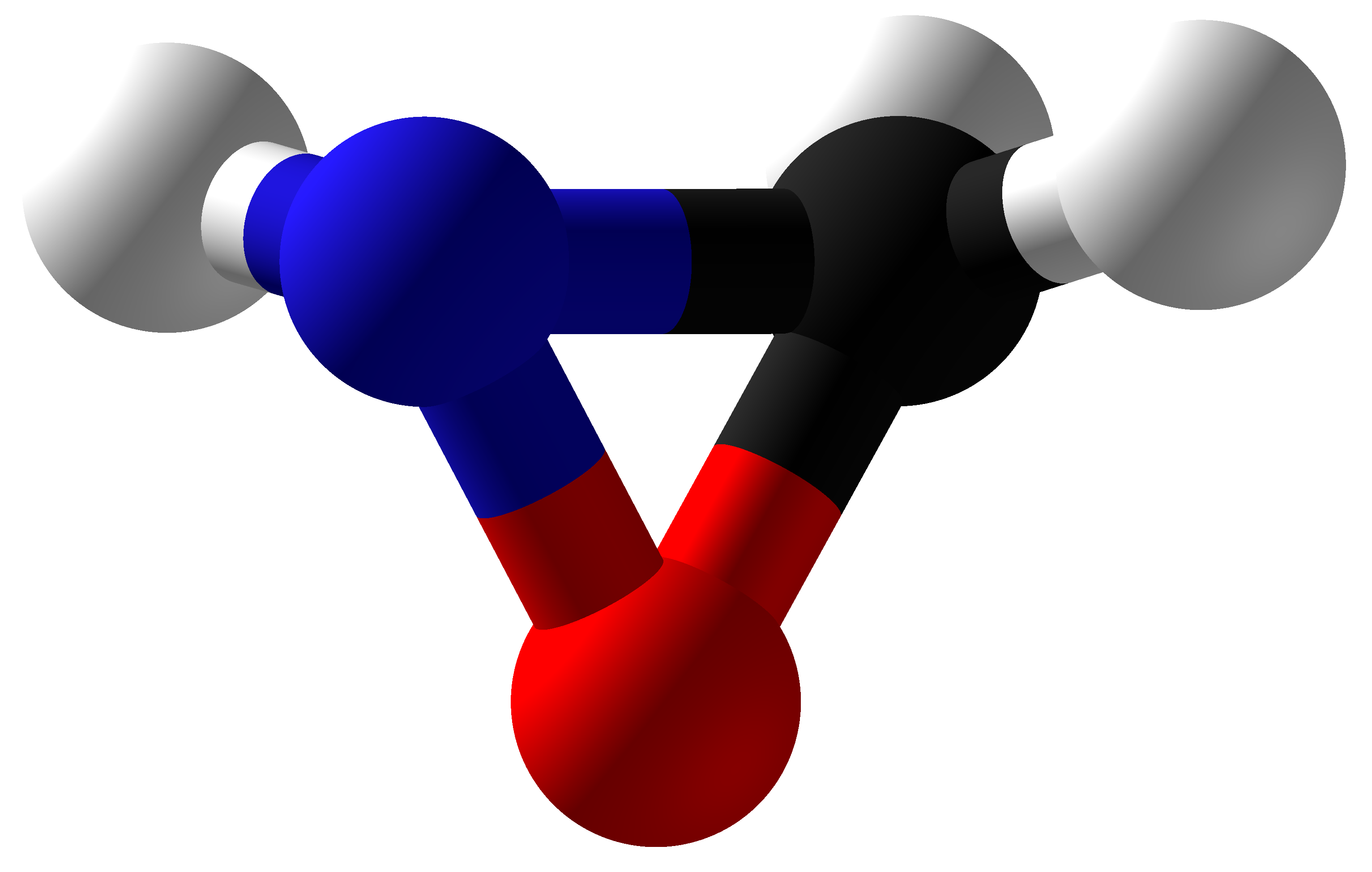

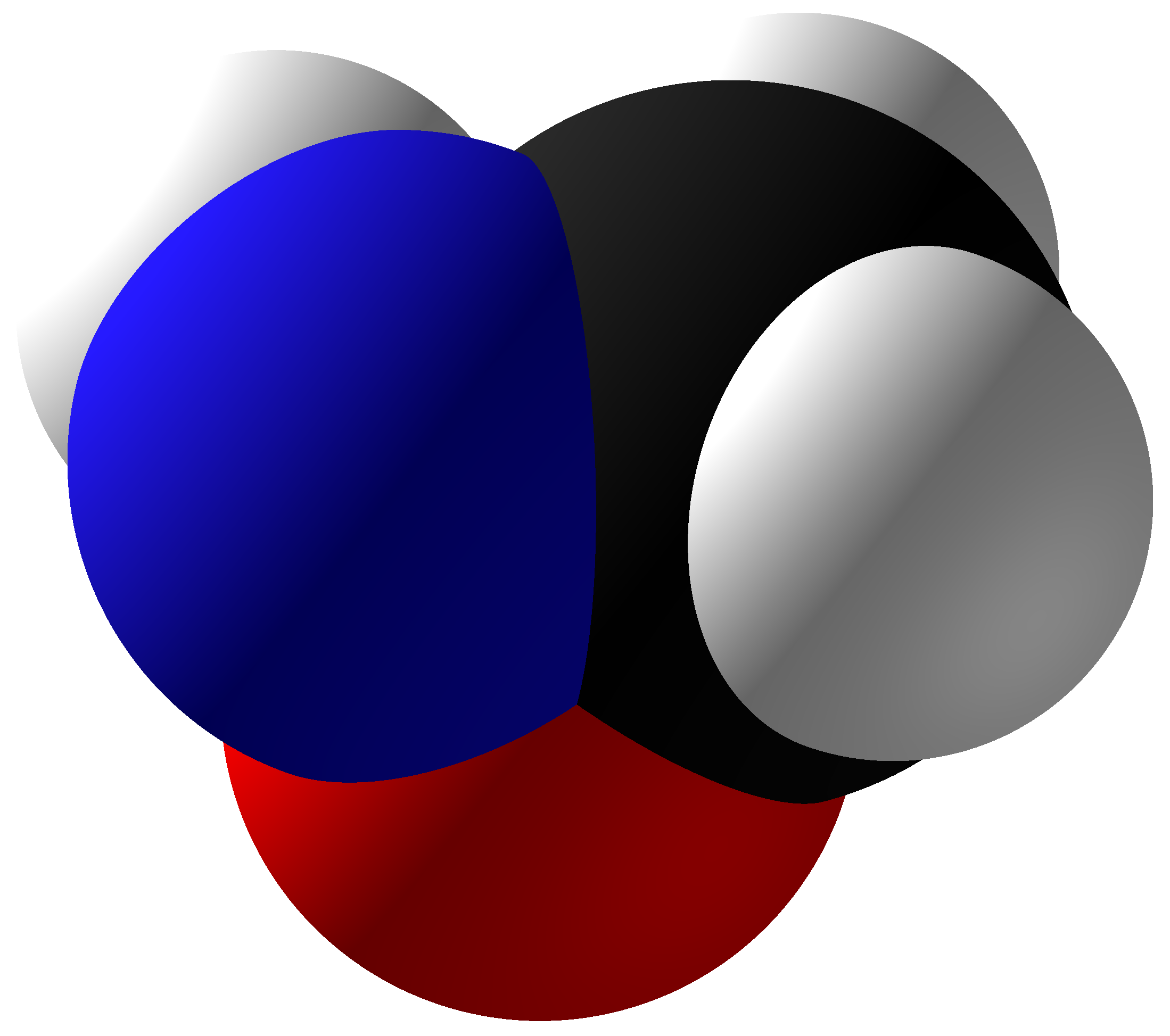

Names
- Preferred IUPAC name Oxaziridine
- Systematic IUPAC name 1-Oxa-2-azacyclopropane
- Other names Oxaaziridine; Oxazacyclopropane

Identifiers
CAS Number	6827-26-5
3D model (JSmol)	Interactive image
ChemSpider	10614170
PubChem CID	15817734
CompTox Dashboard (EPA)	DTXSID90578561
- InChI: InChI=1S/CH3NO/c1-2-3-1/h2H,1H2 Key: SJGALSBBFTYSBA-UHFFFAOYSA-N
- SMILES: C1NO1

Properties
Chemical formula	CH_{3}NO
Molar mass	45.041 g·mol^{−1}
- Except where otherwise noted, data are given for materials in their standard state (at 25 °C [77 °F], 100 kPa). Infobox references

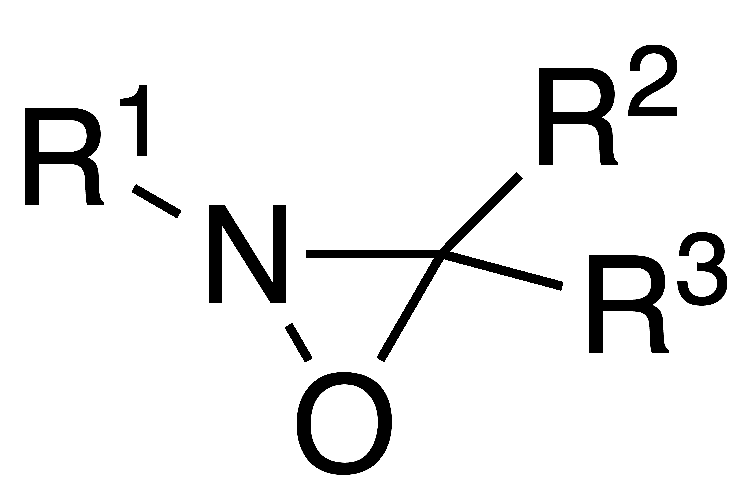
A generic oxaziridine derivative.

An oxaziridine is an organic molecule that features a three-membered heterocycle containing oxygen, nitrogen, and carbon. In their largest industrial application, oxaziridines are intermediates in the production of hydrazine. Oxaziridine derivatives are also used as specialized organic chemistry reagents for a variety of enantioselective oxidations and aminations. Oxaziridines also serve as precursors to nitrones and participate in [3+2] cycloadditions with various heterocumulenes to form substituted five-membered heterocycles.

Some oxaziridines also have the property of a high barrier to inversion of the nitrogen, allowing for the possibility of chirality at the nitrogen center.

== History ==
Oxaziridine derivatives were first reported in the mid-1950s by Emmons and subsequently by Krimm and Horner and Jürgens. All noted that oxaziridine underwent unusual reactions, with both nitrogen and oxygen acting contrary to their usual polarity.

The peroxide process for the industrial production of hydrazine through the oxidation of ammonia with hydrogen peroxide in the presence of ketones was developed in the early 1970s.

In the late 1970s and early 1980s Franklin A. Davis synthesized the first N-sulfonyloxaziridines, which act exclusively as oxygen transfer reagents, and are the most predominantly used class of oxaziridines today.

Chiral camphorsulfonyloxaziridines proved useful in the syntheses of complex products, such as taxol which is marketed as a chemotherapy agent. Both the Holton Taxol total synthesis and the Wender Taxol total synthesis feature asymmetric α-hydroxylation with camphorsulfonyloxaziridine.

Additionally, Forsyth implemented the transformation in his synthesis of the C3-C14 (substituted 1,7-Dioxaspiro[5.5]undec-3-ene) System of okadaic acid.

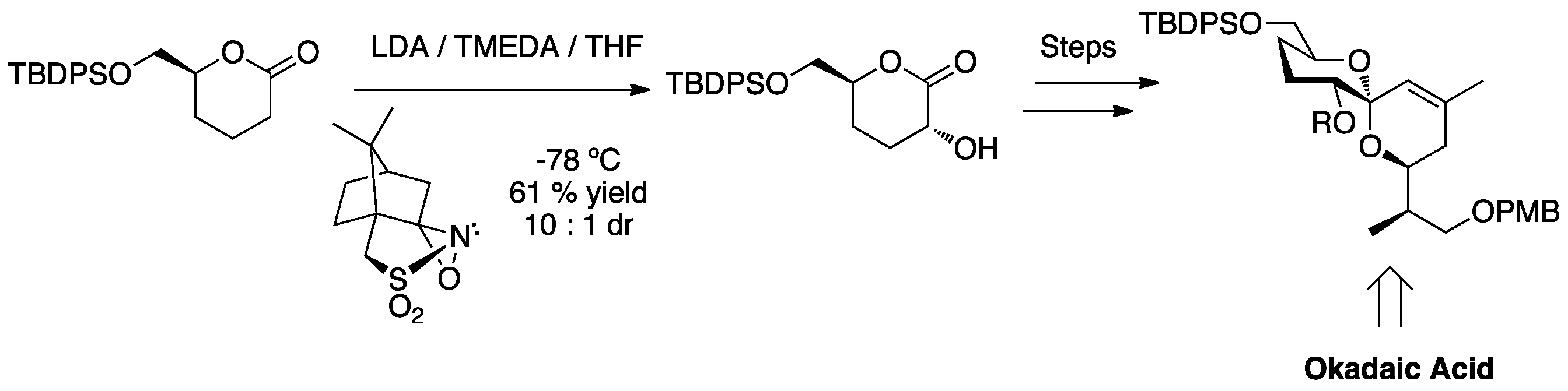
Alpha hydroxylation highlighted in the synthesis of okadaic acid

== Structure and reactivity ==
Whereas oxygen and nitrogen typically act as nucleophiles due to their high electronegativity, oxaziridines allow for electrophilic transfer of either heteroatom. The unusual reactivity occurs because the central three-membered ring has high strain, producing a relatively weak N-O bond.

Some oxaziridines inhibit nitrogen inversion at room temperature, with an energy barrier of 100 to 130 kJ/mol. Enantiopure oxaziridines where stereochemistry is entirely due to configurationally stable nitrogen are reported.

Nucleophiles tend to attack at the aziridine nitrogen when the nitrogen substituent is small (R^{1}= H), and at the oxygen atom when the nitrogen substituent has greater steric bulk.

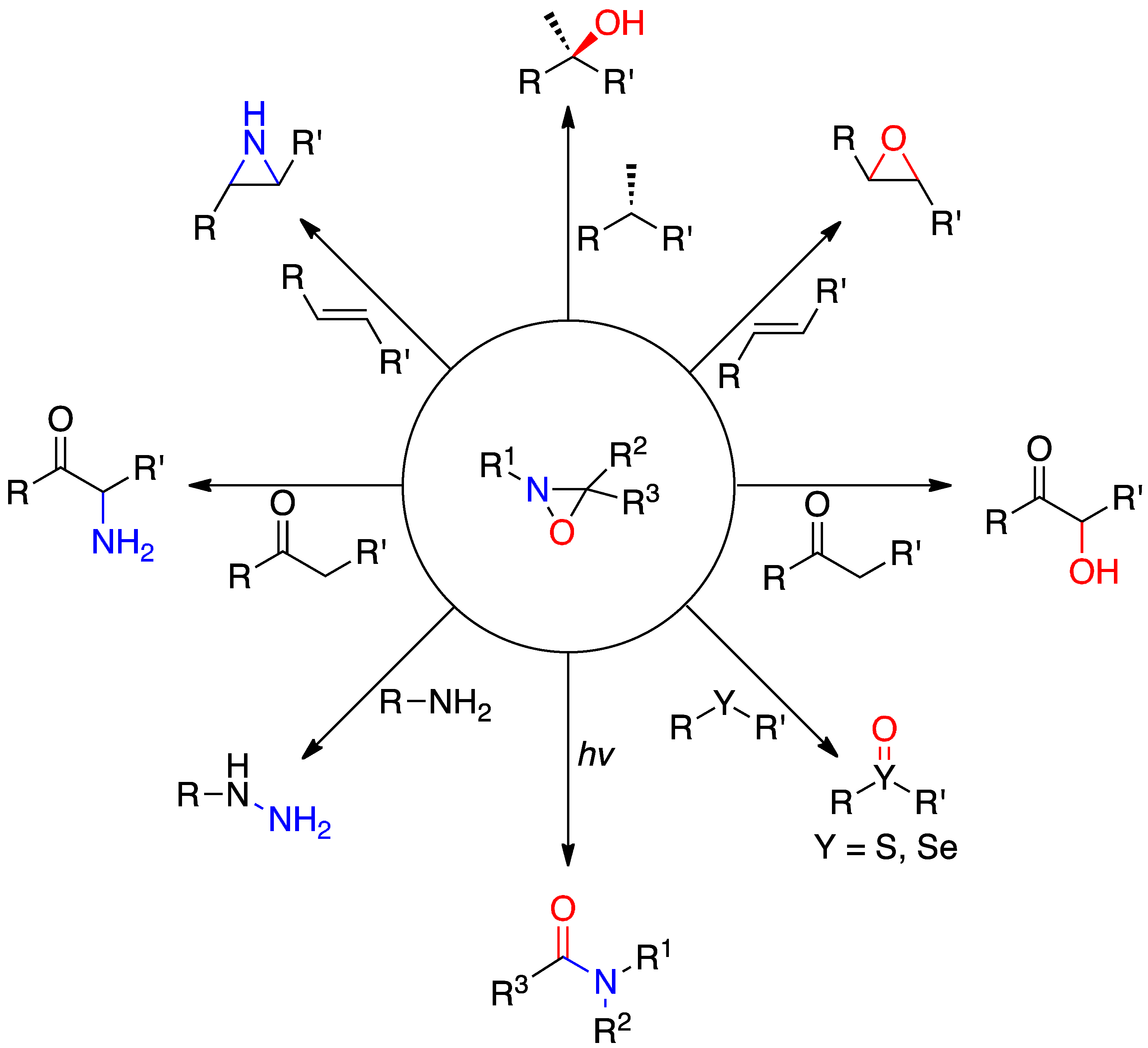

=== Hydrazine production ===
Oxaziridines are intermediates in the peroxide process for hydrazine. Many millions of kilograms of hydrazine are produced annually by this method that involves a step wherein ammonia is oxidized in the presence of methyl ethyl ketone to give the oxaziridine:

Me(Et)C=O + NH_{3} + H_{2}O_{2} → Me(Et)CONH + 2H_{2}O

In subsequent steps the oxaziridine is converted to the hydrazone, which is the immediate in the way to hydrazine:

Me(Et)CONH + NH_{3} → Me(Et)C=NNH_{2} + H_{2}O

=== Oxygen transfer ===
==== α-Hydroxylation of enolates ====
SAMP and RAMP

In the Davis oxidation, N-sulfonyloxaziridines oxidize enolates to acyloins with high chiral induction, better than (e.g.) MoOPH. Chiral induction has been demonstrated with many chiral auxiliaries, including SAMP and RAMP; high yield (77–91%) and dr (95:5 – 99:1) are reported with the Evans' chiral oxazolidinones.

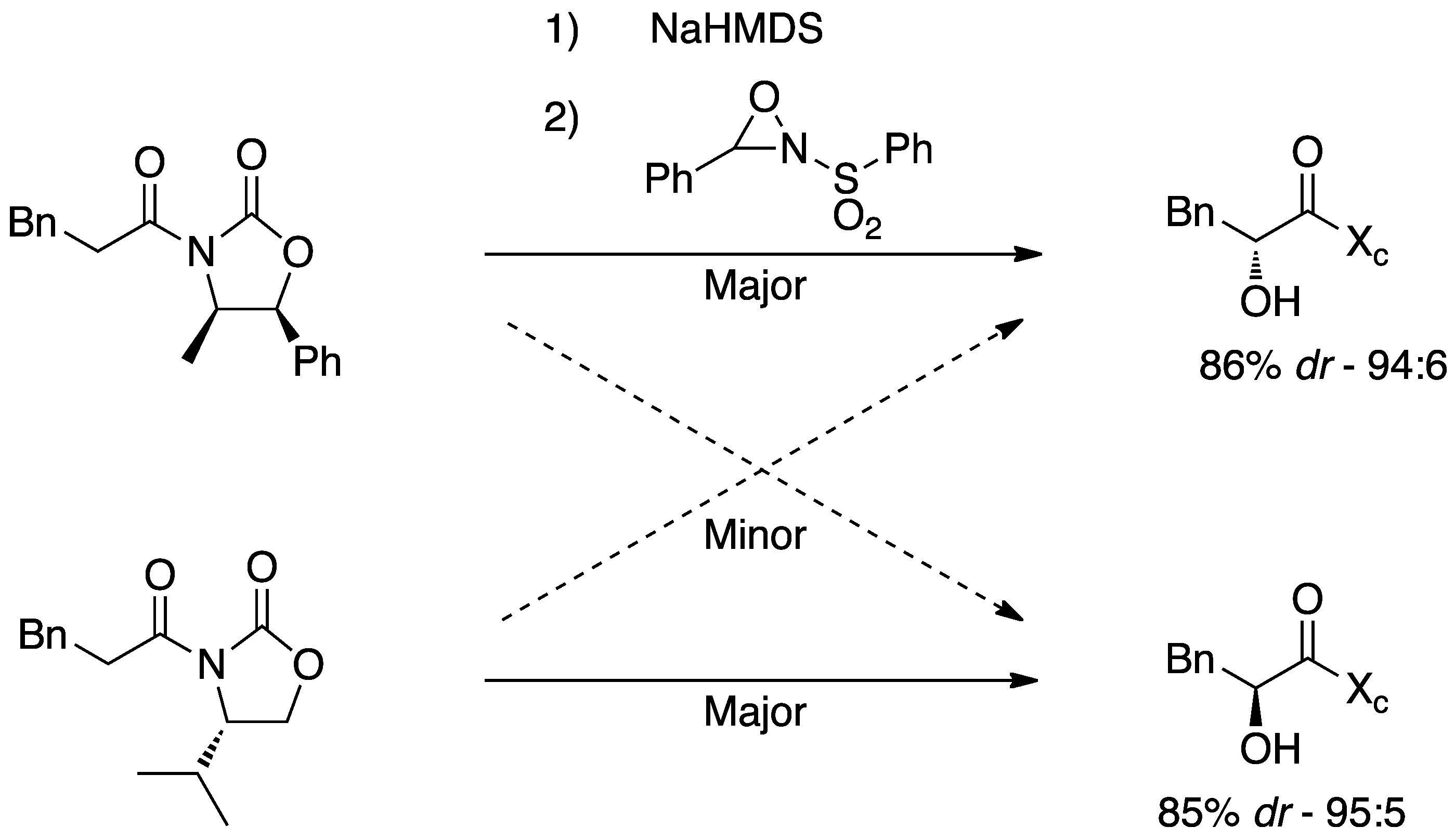
Evans aldol with oxaziridine

Extensive work has been reported on asymmetric hydroxylation of prochiral enolates with camphorsulfonyloxaziridine derivatives, achieving moderate to high enantiomeric excess. The commonly accepted transition state is open, wherefore the steric bulk of R^{1} determines the face of approach.

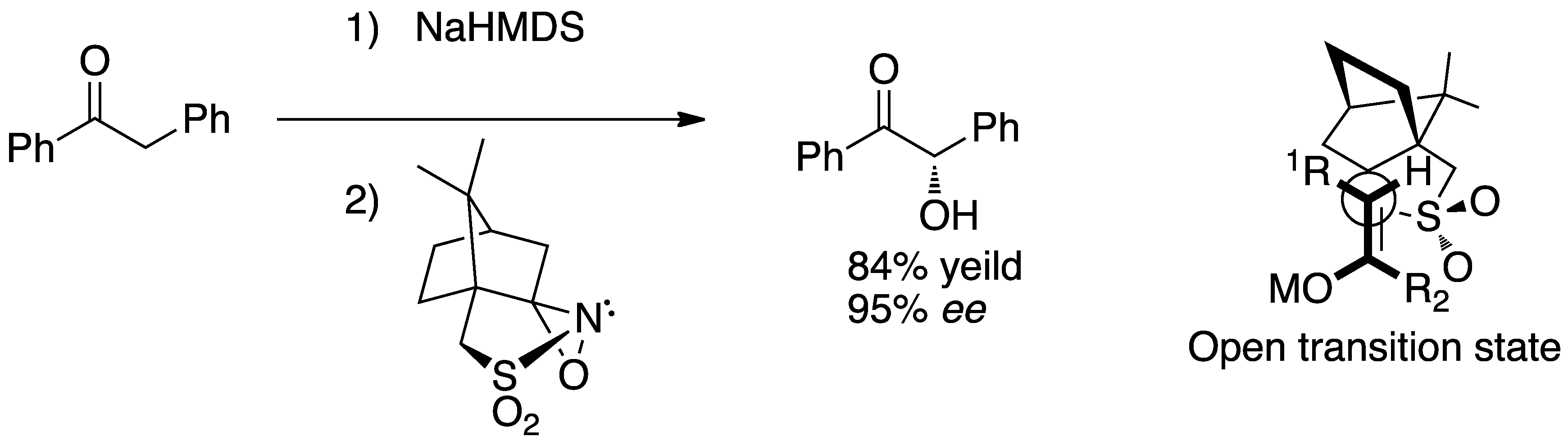
Asymmetric oxaziridine hydroxylation

The selectivity of some hydroxylations may be drastically improved in some cases with the addition of coordinating groups alpha to the oxaziridine ring as oxaziridines 3b and 3c. In these instances it is proposed that the reaction proceeds through a closed transition state where the metal oxyanion is stabilized by chelation from the sulfate and coordinating groups on the camphor skeleton.

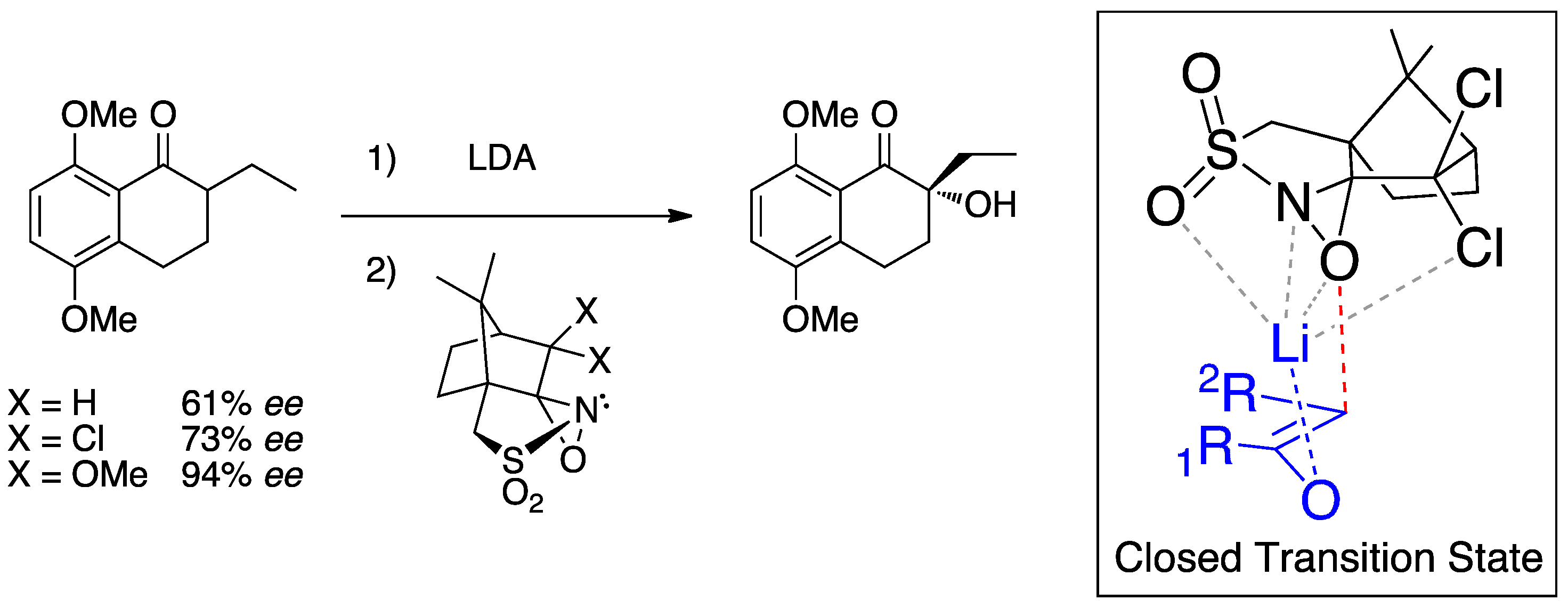
Asymmetric oxaziridine hydroxylation with closed transition state

α-Hydroxylation with oxaziridines has been widely implemented in total synthesis. It is a key step in both the Holton Taxol total synthesis and the Wender Taxol total synthesis.

==== Epoxidation of alkenes ====
In academic research, oxaziridines epoxidize many unfunctionalized alkenes stereospecifically. The reaction can be performed catalytically in the oxaziridine whilst still stereospecific, as in the following oxone-powered epoxidation:

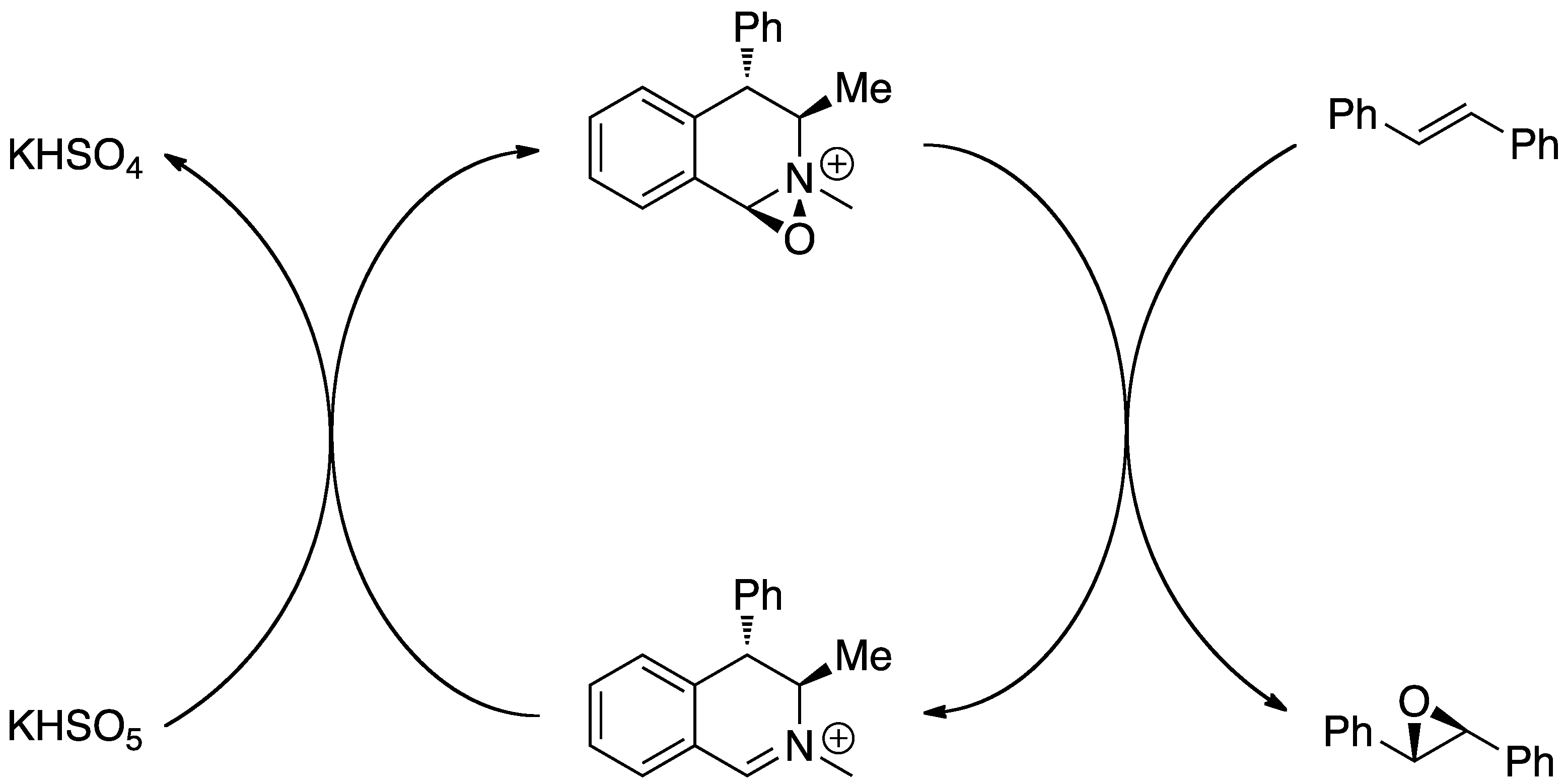

Further investigation into these reactions may be required before levels of enantiometic excess become practical for large scale synthesis.

Oxaziridines can also form highly acid-sensitive epoxides, as in the following conclusion to a (−)-chaetominine synthesis:

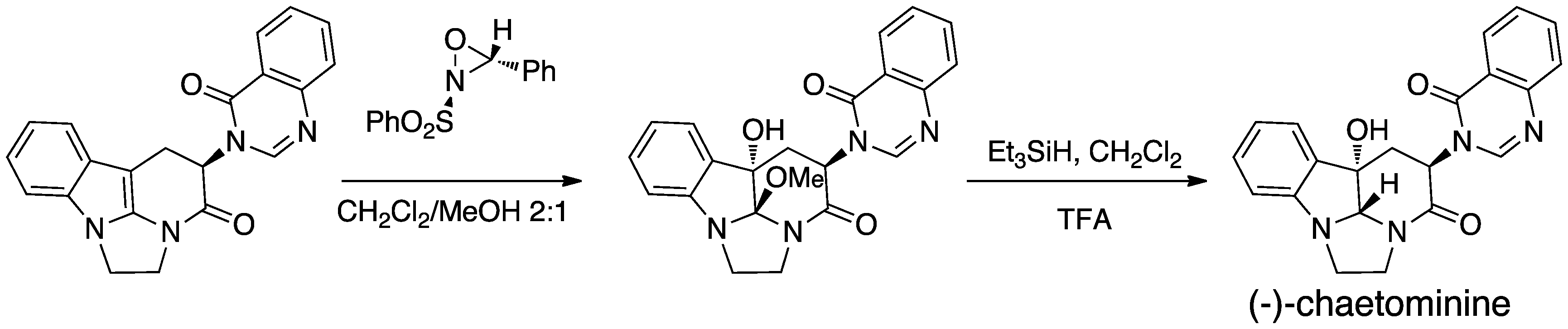
Oxaziridine epoxidation in total synthesis

==== Hydroxylation of unactivated hydrocarbons ====
Perfluorinated oxaziridines hydroxylate unactivated hydrocarbons with remarkable regio- and diastereospecificity. Perfluorinated oxaziridines show high selectivity toward tertiary hydrogens. Hydroxylation of primary carbons and dihydroxylation of a compound with two oxidizable sites have never been observed. Retention of stereochemistry is very high, often 95 to 98%, and often further enhanced by the addition of a fluoride salt.

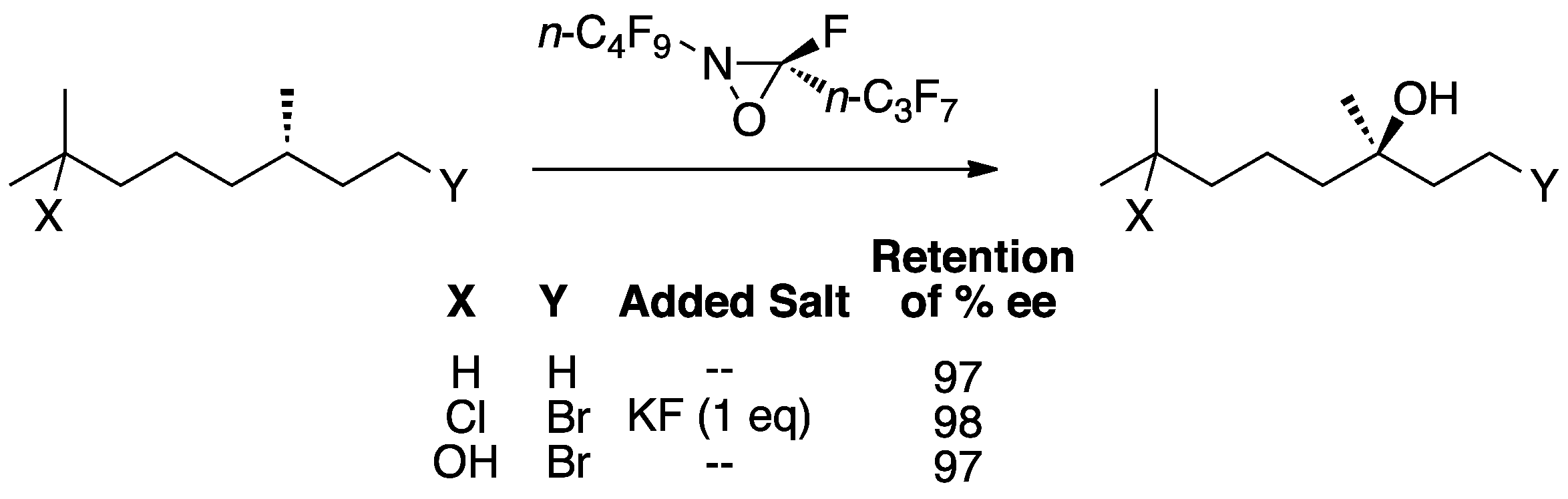
Hydroxylation of unactivated alkanes by perfluorinated oxaziridines

=== Nitrogen transfer ===
Oxaziridines with unsubstituted or acylated nitrogens are capable of nitrogen atom transfer, although this reactivity has received considerably less attention.

==== Amination of N-nucleophiles ====
Hydrazines may be derived from the amination of secondary or tertiary amines, hydroxylamine and thiohydroxamines may be formed from their corresponding alcohols and thiols, sulfimides may be formed from thioethers and α-aminoketones may be formed by attack of corresponding enolates.

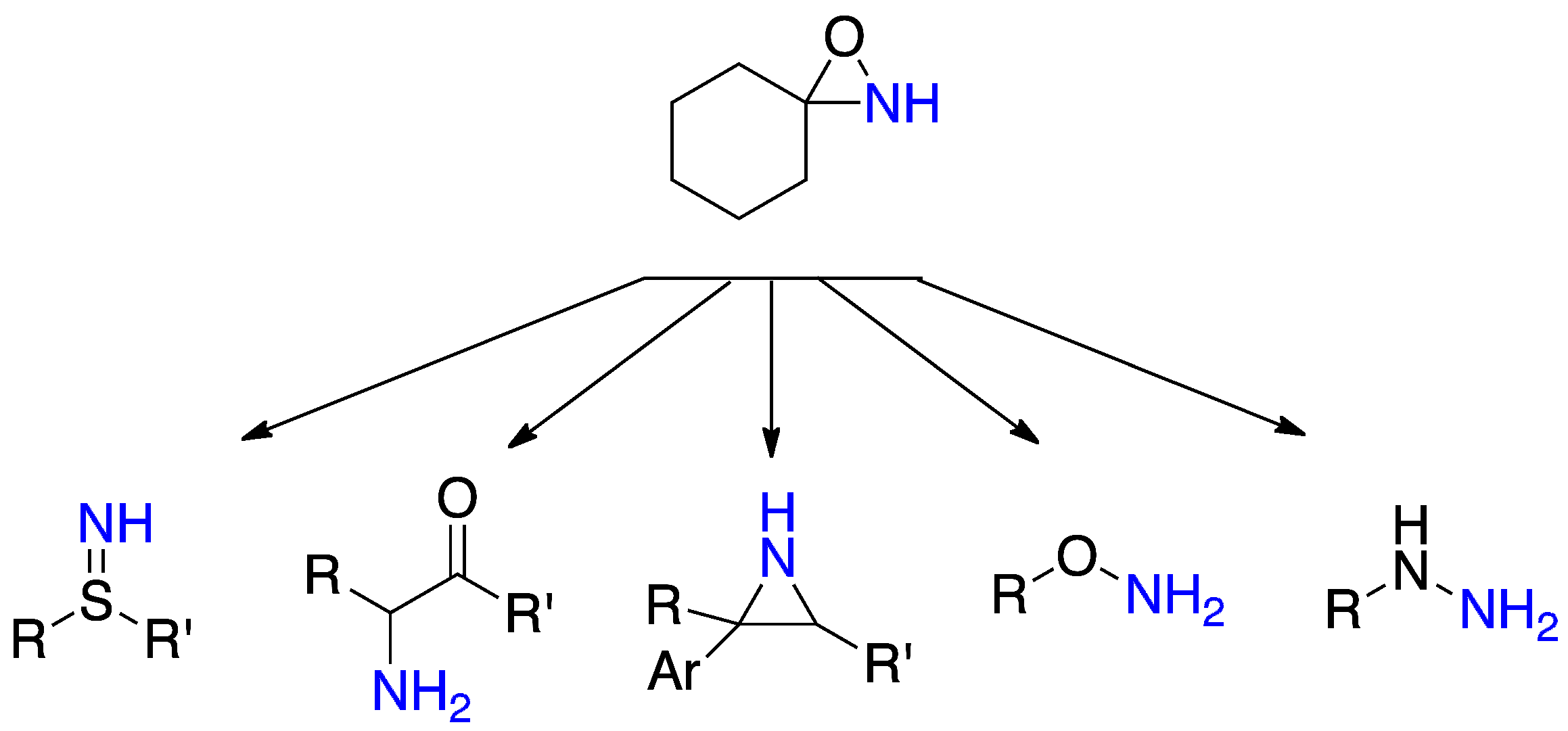
Selected amination reactions with oxaziridine

==== N-acylamidation ====
The transfer of acylated amines is more difficult than that of unsubstituted amines. Unlike amine transfer by oxaziridines, there are no alternative methods that directly transfer acylated amines. Acylamine transfer has primarily been performed using amines and hydrazines as nucleophiles. Very few transfers of acylated nitrogens to carbon nucleophiles have been successfully performed, although some do exist in the literature.

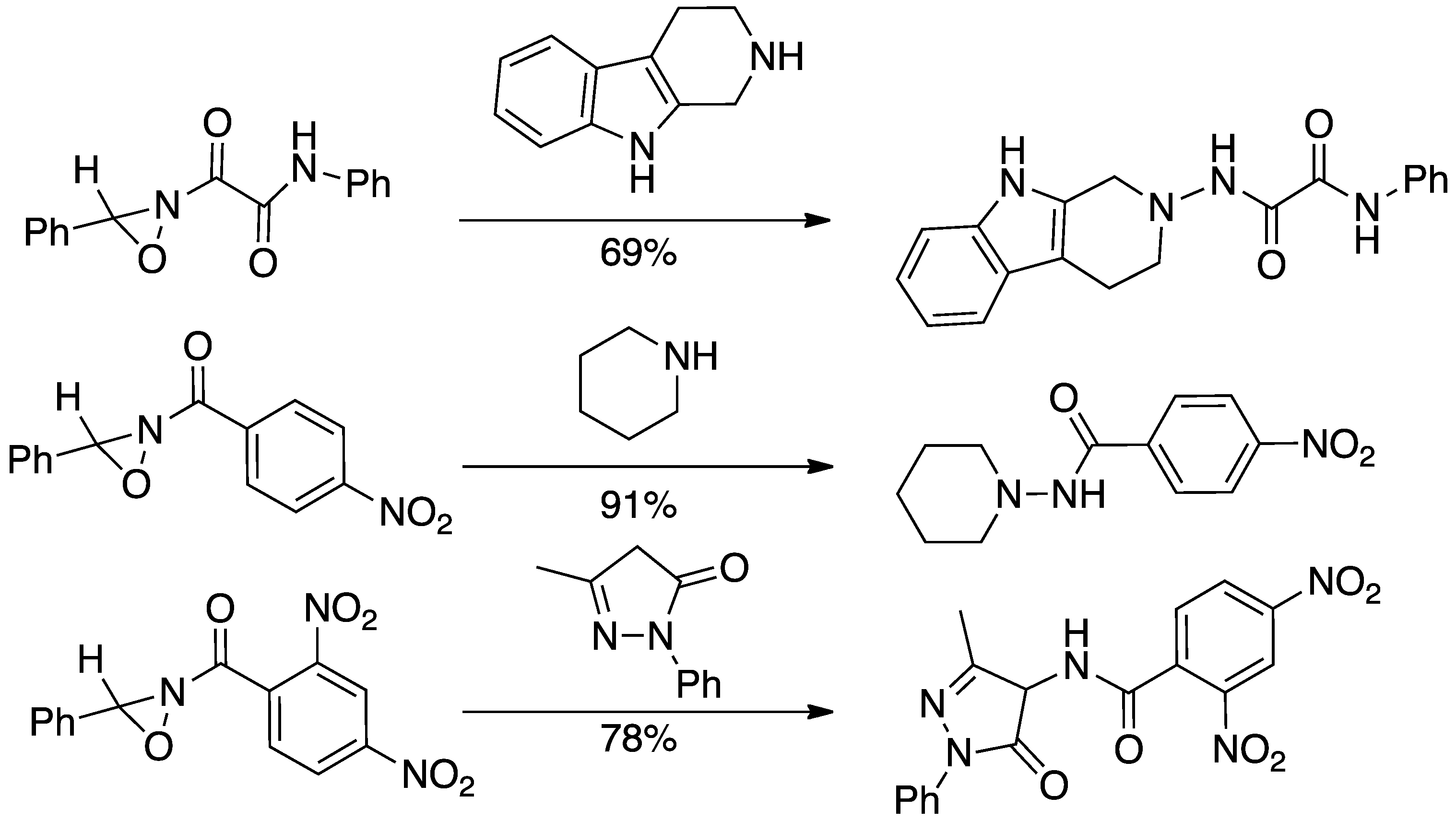
Select acyl transfer reactions of oxaziridine

=== Rearrangements ===
Oxaziridines have been found to undergo rearrangement reactions via a radical mechanism when irradiated with UV light or in the presence of a single electron transfer reagent such as Cu^{I}. spirocylic oxaziridines undergo ring expansions to the corresponding lactam. The migrating substituent is determined by a stereoelectronic effect where the group trans to the lone pair on the nitrogen will always be the predominant migration product. In light of this effect, it is possible to take advantage of the chiral nitrogen due to high inversion barrier to direct the rearrangement. This phenomenon is demonstrated by observed selectivities in the rearrangements below. In the rearrangement on the left the thermodynamically unfavorable product is observed exclusively, while in the reaction on the right the product derived from the less stable radical intermediate is favored.

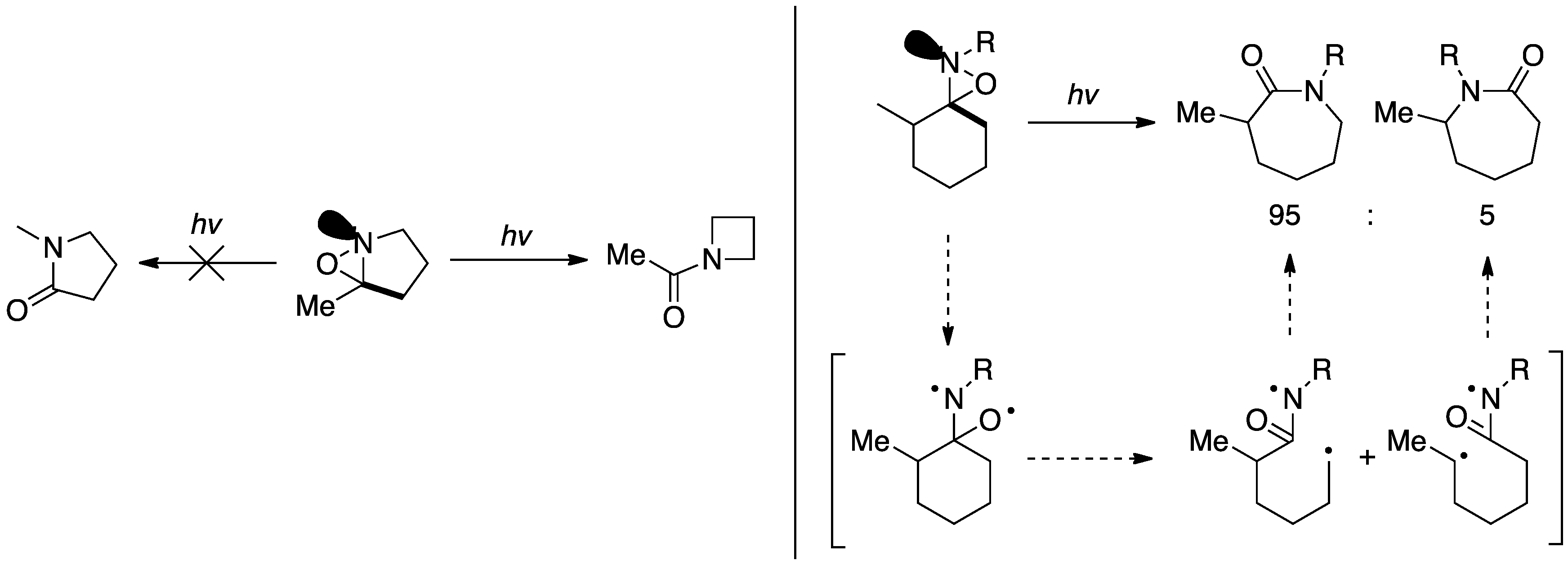
Evidence for selectivity based on nitrogen lone pair orientation.

Aubé takes advantage of this rearrangement as the key step in his synthesis of (+)-yohimbine, a natural medicine classified by the NIH as possibly effective in the treatment of erectile dysfunction and the sexual problems caused by selective serotonin reuptake inhibitors.

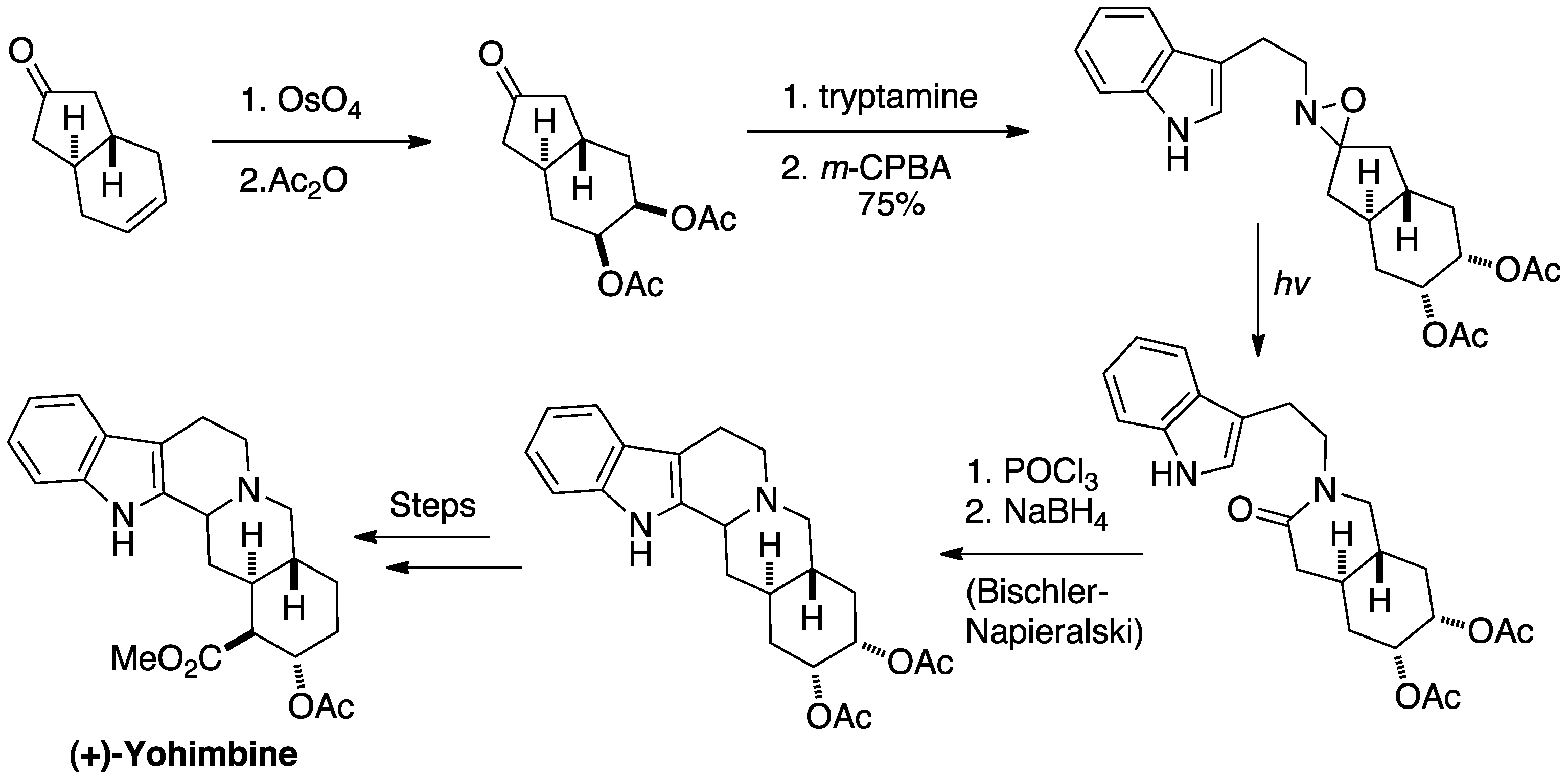
Synthesis of (+)-Yohimbine

It is also notable that oxaziridines will thermally rearrange to nitrones. Cis-trans selectivity of the resulting nitrone is poor, however, yields are good to excellent. It is thought that some oxaziridines racemize over time through a nitrone intermediate.

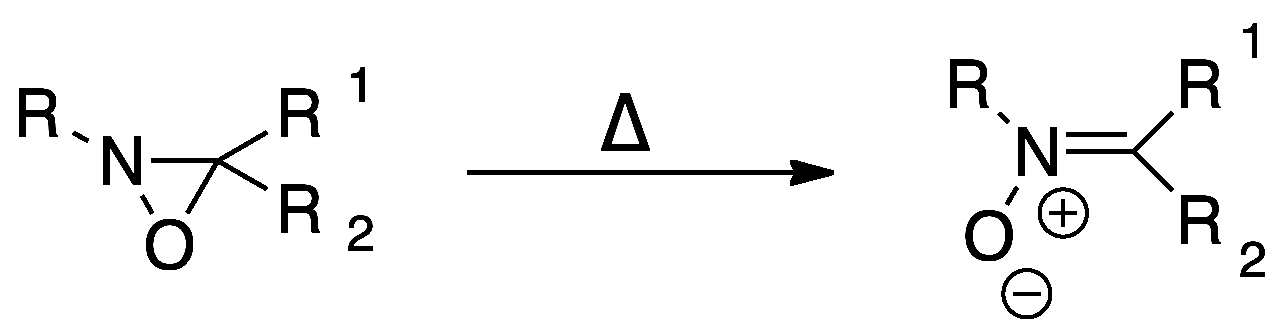
Conversion of an oxaziridine to a nitrone.

=== Cycloadditions with heterocumulenes ===
Oxaziridines undergo cycloaddition reactions with heterocumulenes to afford a number of unique five membered heterocycles, as shown in the figure below. This reactivity is due to the strained three membered ring and weak N-O bond.

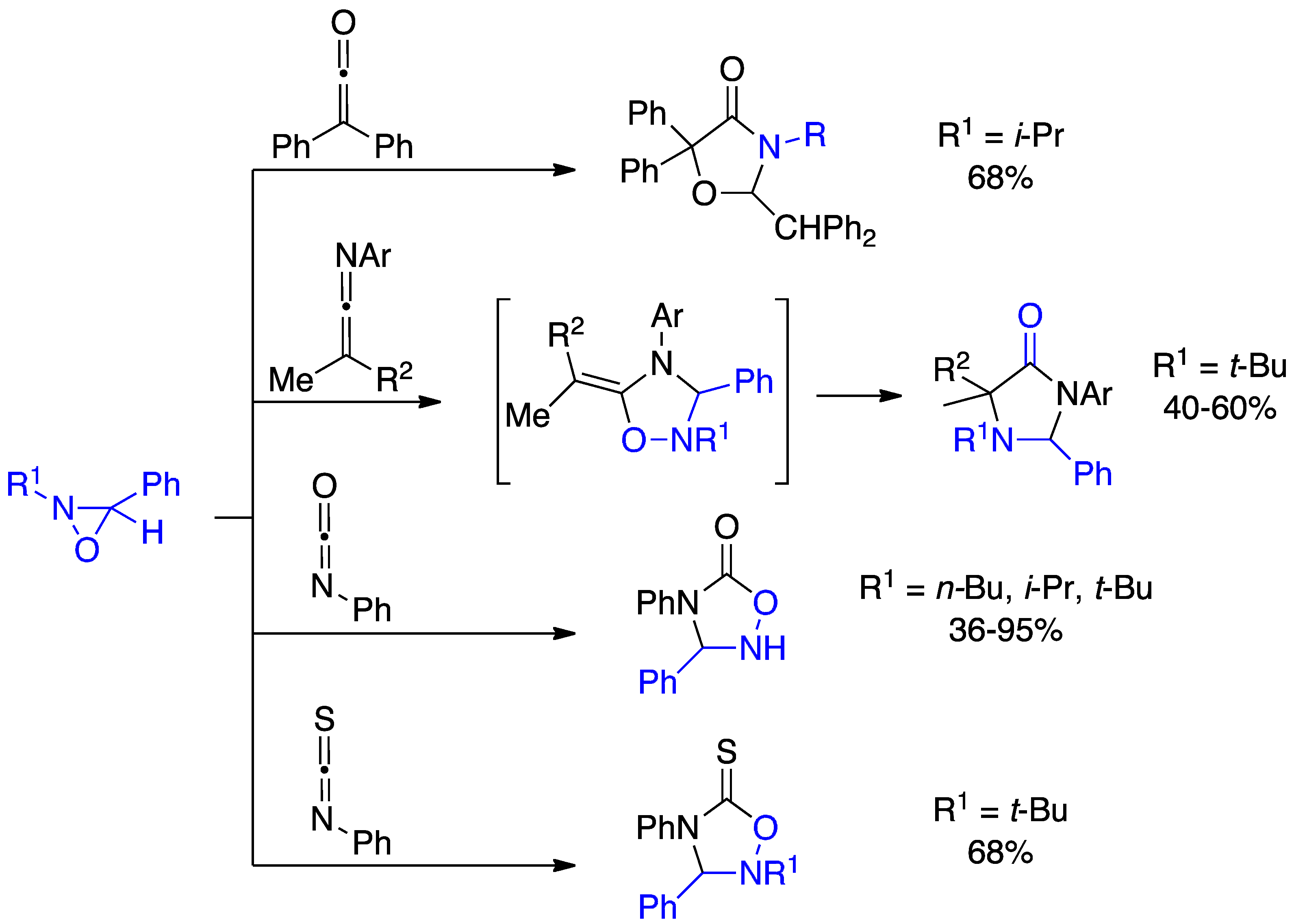

== Synthesis ==
=== N-H, N-alkyl, N-aryloxaziridines ===
The two main syntheses of N-H, N-alkyl, and N-aryloxaziridines are imine oxidation with peracids (A) and carbonyl amination (B).

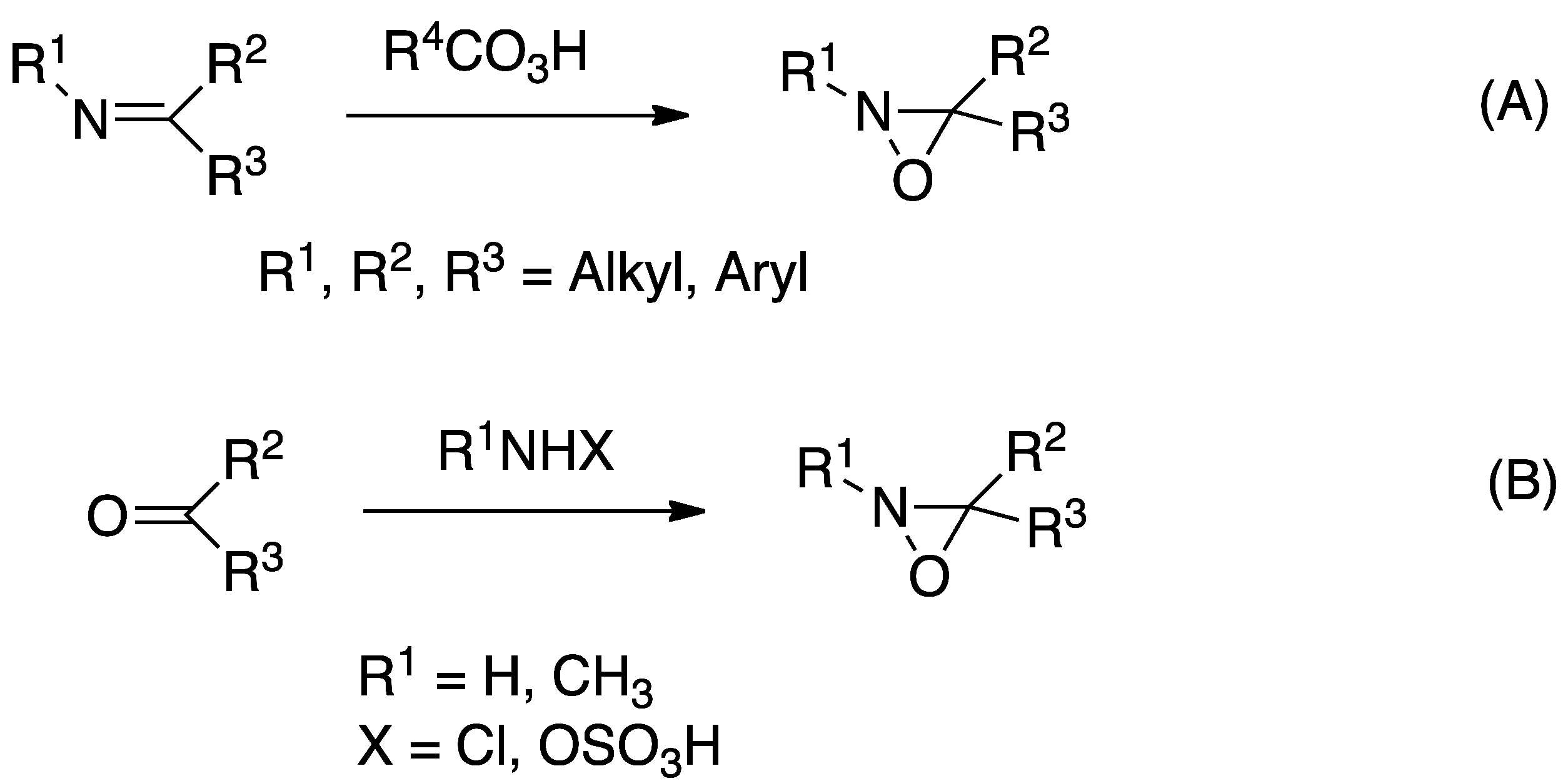
General oxaziridine synthesis

Oxidation of chiral imines and oxidation of imines with chiral peracids may yield enantiopure oxaziridines.

=== N-sulfonyloxaziridines ===
Many N-sulfonyloxaziridines are used today, each with slightly different properties and reactivity. These reagents are summarized in the table below. While originally synthesized with mCPBA and the phase transfer catalyst benzyltrimethylammonium chloride, an improved synthesis using oxone as the oxidant is now most prevalent.

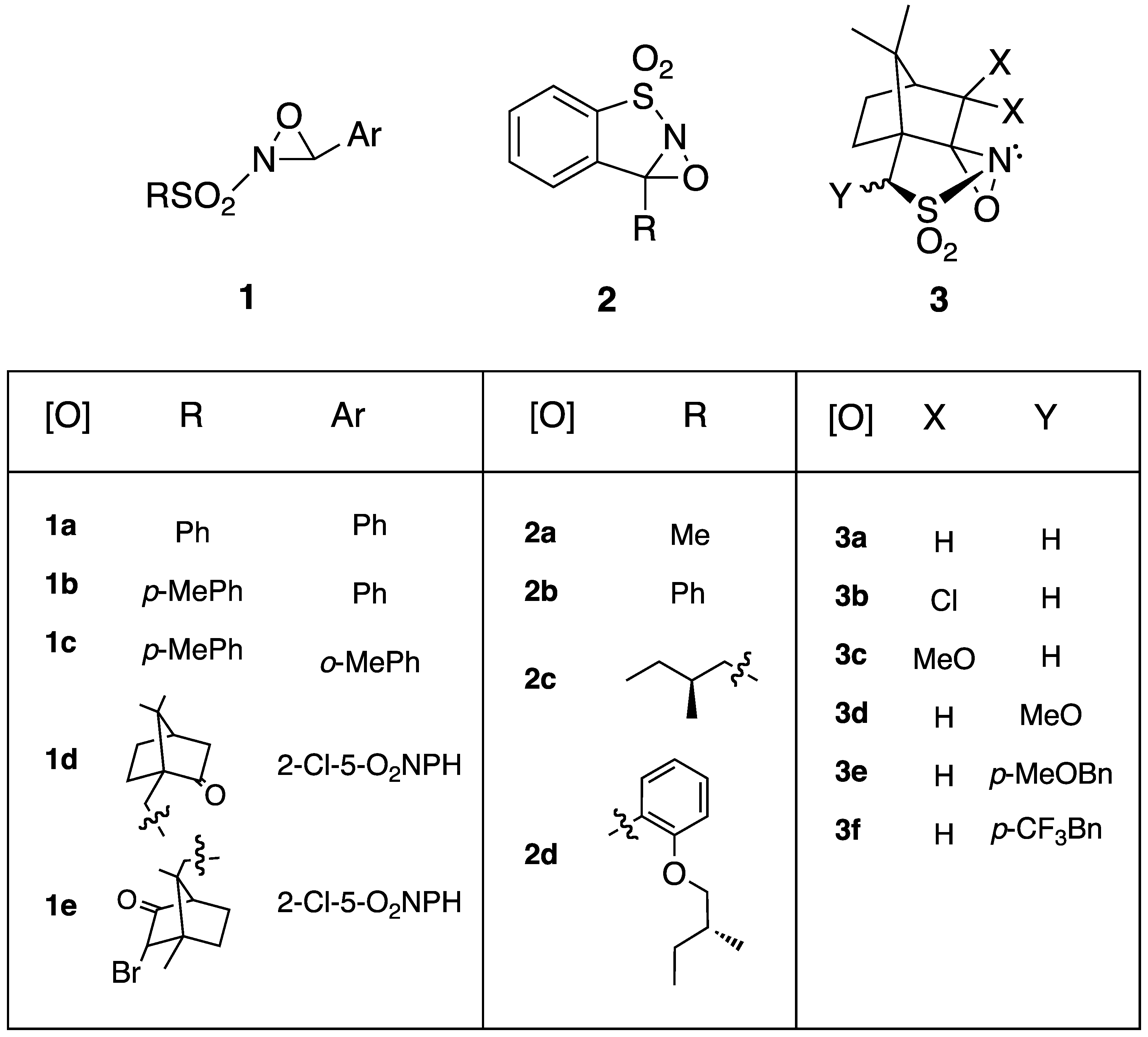
Table of various N-sulfonyloxaziridine reagents

=== Perfluorinated oxaziridines ===
With highly electron withdrawing perfluoroalkyl substituents, oxaziridines react more similarly to dioxiranes . Notably, perfluoroalkyloxaziridines hydroxylate certain C-H bonds with high selectivity. Perfluorinated oxaziridines may be synthesized by subjecting a perfluorinated imine to perfluoromethyl fluorocarbonyl peroxide and a metal fluoride to act as an HF scavenger.

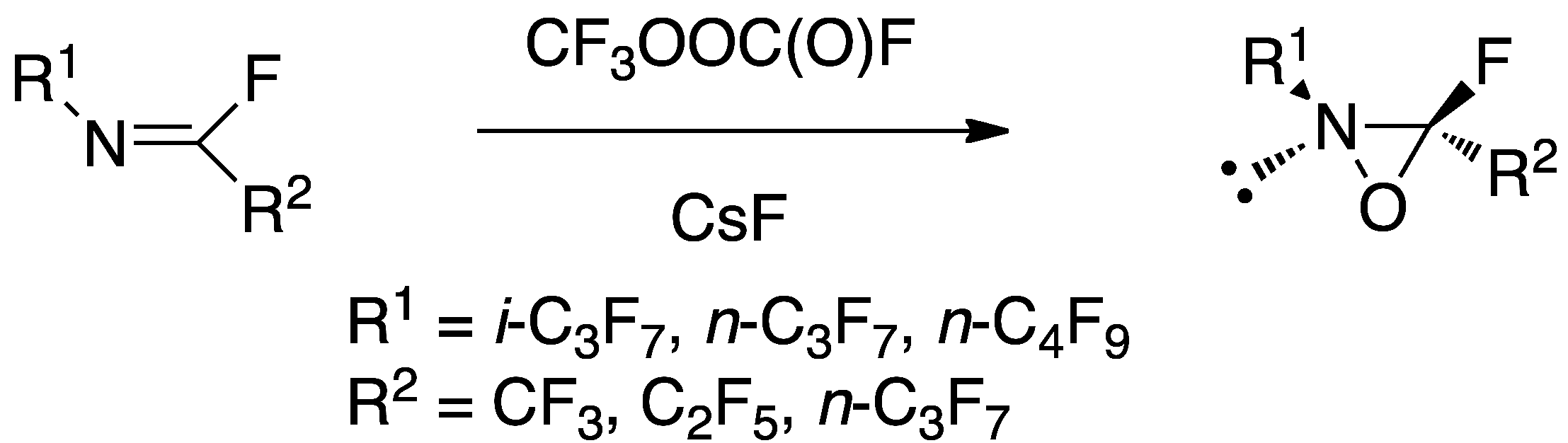
Synthesis of perfluorinated oxaziridines
