= Acyloin =

Organic compounds of the form –C(O)CH(OH)–

The structure of a typical acyloin.

In organic chemistry, acyloins or α-hydroxy ketones are a class of organic compounds of the general form R−C(O)CH(OH)−R', composed of a hydroxy group (−OH) adjacent to a ketone group (>C=O). The name acyloin is derived from the fact that they are formally derived from reductive coupling of carboxylic acyl groups (−C(=O)OH). They are one of the two main classes of hydroxy ketones, distinguished by the position of the hydroxy group relative to the ketone; in this form, the hydroxy is on the alpha carbon, explaining the secondary name of α-hydroxy ketone.

== Synthesis ==
Classic organic reactions exist for the synthesis of acyloins.

- The acyloin condensation is a reductive coupling of esters, and particularly effective for macrocycle synthesis. Similarly, in rare cases, pinacol conditions couple an aldehyde or ketone and a lactone to give an acyloin.
- The benzoin condensation is condensation reaction between aldehydes catalyzed by carbene-like nucleophiles
- Oxidation of carbonyls is possible with molecular oxygen but not selective
- Better alternative is oxidation of corresponding silyl enol ethers with mCPBA in the Rubottom oxidation
- MoOPH oxidation of carbonyls is a system with molybdenum peroxide, pyridine and hexamethylphosphoramide.
- A family of stereoselective syntheses oxidizes in situ enols with nitroso equivalents. In the simplest version, nitrosobenzene oxidizes a carbonyl to an α‑hydroxylamine, with a proline organocatalyst for enantioselection. In a more elaborate version, enolates can be oxidized by sulfonyloxaziridines.

=== Oxidation with Sulfonyloxaridines ===
When sulfonyloxaziridines oxidize enol(ate)s, the latter reacts by nucleophilic displacement at the electron deficient oxygen of the oxaziridine ring.

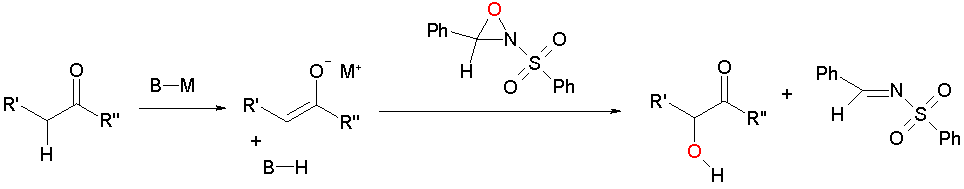

This reaction type is extended to asymmetric synthesis by the use of chiral oxaziridines derived from camphor (camphorsulfonyl oxaziridine). Each isomer gives exclusive access to one of the two possible enantiomers. This modification is applied in the Holton taxol total synthesis.

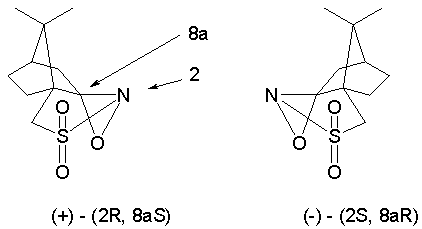

In the enolate oxidation of the cyclopentadienone below with either camphor enantiomer, the trans isomer is obtained because access for the hydroxyl group in the cis position is limited. The use of the standard oxaziridine did not result in an acyloin.

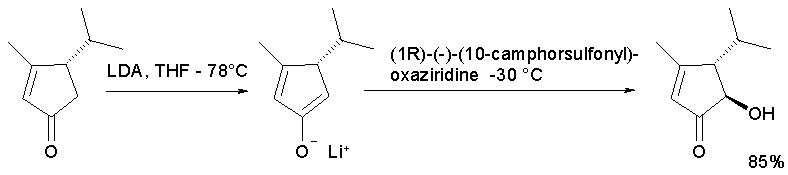

== Reactions ==
- Reduction of acyloins gives diols, or, in some cases, ketones.
- Oxidation of acyloins gives diones.
- α-hydroxy ketones give positive Tollens' and Fehling's test.
- The α-ketol rearrangement: some acyloins rearrange with positions swapped under the influence of heat, acid, or base. For sugars, this is the Lobry–de Bruyn–van Ekenstein transformation.
- A similar reaction is the so-called Voigt amination where an acyloin reacts with a primary amine and phosphorus pentoxide to an α-keto amine:

- Indole synthesis, compare Bischler–Möhlau

== See also ==
- Glycolaldehyde, a related molecule equivalent to an acyloin with both R groups as hydrogen (and thus an aldehyde not a ketone)
