= MoOPH =

Names
- Other names Oxodiperoxymolybdenum(pyridine)(hexamethylphosphoric triamide); Vedejs Reagent

Identifiers
CAS Number	23319-63-3
3D model (JSmol)	Interactive image
ChemSpider	9743008
PubChem CID	5148822 (wrong formula)
CompTox Dashboard (EPA)	DTXSID70715578
- InChI: InChI= 1S/C6H18N3OP.C5H5N.Mo.2O2.O/c1-7(2)11(10,8(3)4)9(5)6;1-2-4-6-5-3-1;;2*1-2;/h1-6H3;1-5H;;;;/q;;+4;2*-2; Key: PPRBHGIGPWBROO-UHFFFAOYSA-N
- SMILES: c0cccc[n+]0[Mo-2]12(OO1)(OO2)(=O)[O+]=P(N(C)C)(N(C)C)N(C)C

Properties
Chemical formula	C_{11}H_{23}MoN_{4}O_{6}P
Molar mass	434.25 g·mol^{−1}
Appearance	Yellow crystals
Melting point	103–105 °C (217–221 °F; 376–378 K) (dec)
- Except where otherwise noted, data are given for materials in their standard state (at 25 °C [77 °F], 100 kPa). Infobox references

MoOPH, also known as oxodiperoxymolybdenum(pyridine)-(hexamethylphosphoric triamide), is a reagent used in organic synthesis. It contains a molybdenum(VI) center with multiple oxygen ligands, coordinated with pyridine and HMPA ligands, although the HMPA can be replaced by DMPU. It is an electrophilic source of oxygen that reacts with enolates and related structures, and thus can be used for alpha-hydroxylation of carbonyl-containing compounds. Other reagents used for alpha-hydroxylation via enol or enolate structures include Davis oxaziridine, oxygen, and various peroxyacids (see Rubottom oxidation). This reagent was first utilized by Edwin Vedejs as an efficient alpha-hydroxylating agent in 1974 and an effective preparative procedure was later published in 1978.

== Synthesis ==
MoOPH is synthesized from molybdenum trioxide by oxidation with hydrogen peroxide and addition of the HMPA and pyridine ligands:
$$\ce{MoO3} \xrightarrow{\stackrel{1. \ce{H2O2}}{2. \ce{HMPA}}} \ce{MoO5 (H2O) (HMPA)} \xrightarrow{\text{0.2 Torr}} \ce{MoO5 (HMPA)} \xrightarrow{\text{Pyridine}} \ce{MoO5(HMPA)(pyridine)}$$

== Reactivity ==
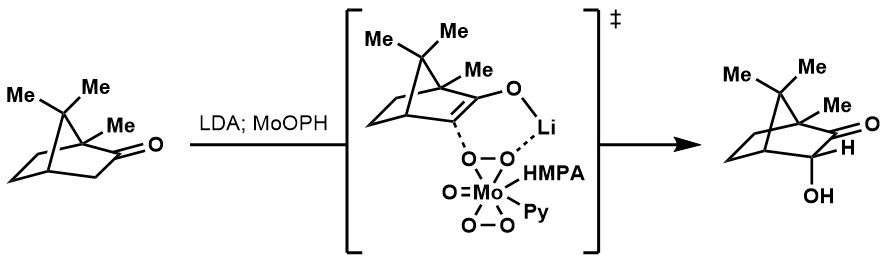
Transition state for MoOPH alpha-hydroxylation

Due to MoOPH's steric bulk, preferential attack at the O–O bond occurs from the less hindered enolate face in the absence of stereoelectronic factors.

In addition, nitriles with acidic alpha protons can be converted directly to cyanohydrins; however, in the case of branched nitriles, this reaction directly affords the ketone.

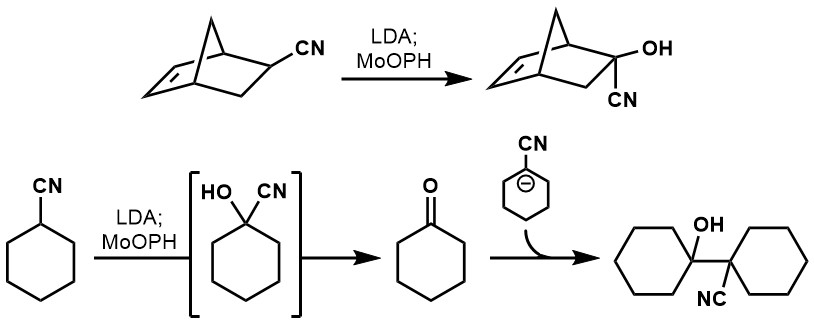

In the case of sulfones, alpha-hydroxylation leads directly to the ketone or aldehyde.

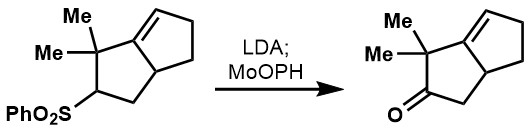

Common byproducts of the alpha-hydroxylation tend to include overoxidation to the corresponding dicarbonyl or intermolecular aldol reaction of the starting material. Procedures to prevent side reactions include the inverse addition of the enolate to MoOPH or careful control of the temperature (-78 to -20 °C). Notable miscellaneous reactions include MoOPH’s ability to oxidize alkylboranes directly to the alcohol with net stereo-retention.

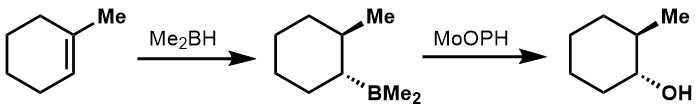

MoOPH has also been shown to oxidize N-trimethylsilyl amides directly to the hydroxamic acid.

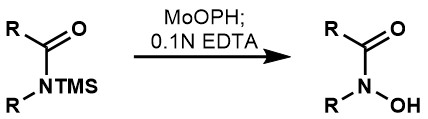
