= Davis reagent =

Names
- IUPAC name 2-(Benzenesulfonyl)-3-phenyloxaziridine
- Other names: 2-(Phenylsulfonyl)-3-phenyloxaziridine

Identifiers
CAS Number	63160-13-4
3D model (JSmol)	Interactive image
ChemSpider	283625
ECHA InfoCard	100.314.396
PubChem CID	320405
CompTox Dashboard (EPA)	DTXSID10313234
- InChI: InChI=1S/C13H11NO3S/c15-18(16,12-9-5-2-6-10-12)14-13(17-14)11-7-3-1-4-8-11/h1-10,13H
- SMILES: C1=CC=C(C=C1)C2N(O2)S(=O)(=O)C3=CC=CC=C3

Properties
Chemical formula	C_{13}H_{11}NO_{3}S
Molar mass	261.30 g·mol^{−1}

Hazards
- GHS labelling
Pictograms	(GHS07: Exclamation mark)
- Except where otherwise noted, data are given for materials in their standard state (at 25 °C [77 °F], 100 kPa). Infobox references

Davis reagent (3-phenyl-2-(phenylsulfonyl)-1,2-oxaziridine or 2-(benzenesulfonyl)-3-phenyloxaziridine) is a reagent used for oxidation in the Davis oxidation reaction, as well as oxidation of thiols to sulfones. It is named for Franklin A. Davis.
