= Sulfinamide =

Molecules of the form >N–S(=O)–

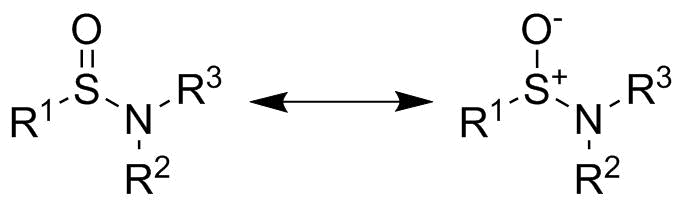
General structure of sulfinamides, showing both correct zwitterionic and "expanded octet" simplified convention

In organosulfur chemistry, sulfinamide is a functional group with the structure R−S(O)−NR_{2} (where R = alkyl or aryl). This functionality is composed of a sulfur-carbon (S−C) single bond, a sulfur-nitrogen (S−N) single bond, and a sulfur-oxygen (S-O) bond (see Sulfoxide for the nature of this bond). As a non-bonding electron pair is present on the sulfur, the sulfur atom is a stable stereogenic centre, and so these compounds are chiral. They are sometimes referred to as S-chiral sulfinamides. Sulfinamides are amides of sulfinic acid (R−S(O)OH).

== Structure ==
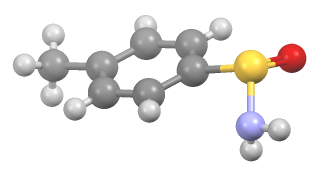
Structure of Davis' sulfinamide (p-tolylsulfinamide), highlighting the pyramidal nature of the S center

Sulfinamides do not undergo inversion. They can therefore be synthesised and/or isolated in enantiopure forms. This has led to their use as chiral ammonia equivalents. Chiral sulfinamides such as tert-butanesulfinamide, p-toluenesulfinamide and 2,4,6-trimethylbenzenesulfinamide are all chiral auxiliaries.

== Synthesis ==
Sulfinamides are traditionally produced by the reaction of sulfinyl chlorides with primary or secondary amines. They also arise by the addition of Grignard reagents to sulfinylamines, followed by protonation:

RMgX + R'N=S=O → RS(O)(NR'MgX)
RS(O)(NR'MgX) + H_{2}O → RS(O)(NR'H) + "MgX(OH)"

Yet another route entails peracid-oxidation of sulfenylphthalimides, which gives sulfinylphthalimides.

== Examples ==
A common sulfinamide is tert-butanesulfinamide (Ellman's sulfinamide), p-toluenesulfinamide (Davis' sulfinamide), and mesitylsulfinamide.

Sulfinamides arise in nature by the addition of nitroxyl (HNO) to thiols:

RSH + HNO → RS(O)NH_{2}
