= Magnesium monoperoxyphthalate =

Names
- Preferred IUPAC name Magnesium bis(2-carbonoperoxoylbenzoate)
- Other names H48; MMPP

Identifiers
| CAS Number | 84665-66-7 |
| 3D model (JSmol) | Interactive image |
| ChemSpider | 2006682 |
| ECHA InfoCard | 100.071.808 |
| EC Number | 279-013-0 |
| PubChem CID | 3081588 |
| UNII | YN884S965H |
| CompTox Dashboard (EPA) | DTXSID401000154 |
- InChI: InChI=1S/2C8H6O5.Mg/c2*9-7(10)5-3-1-2-4-6(5)8(11)13-12;/h2*1-4,12H,(H,9,10);/q;;+2/p-2 Key: PIOZZBNFRIZETM-UHFFFAOYSA-L
- SMILES: [Mg++].OOC(=O)C1=CC=CC=C1C([O-])=O.OOC(=O)C1=CC=CC=C1C([O-])=O

Properties
| Chemical formula | C_{16}H_{10}MgO_{10} |
| Molar mass | 386.551 g·mol^{−1} |

Hazards
- GHS labelling
| Pictograms | (GHS02: Flammable) (GHS05: Corrosive) (GHS07: Exclamation mark) |
| Signal word | Danger |
| Hazard statements | H242, H314, H332 |
| Precautionary statements | P210, P260, P280, P303+P361+P353, P305+P351+P338, P370+P378 |
| Flash point | 173.4 °C (344.1 °F; 446.5 K) |
- Except where otherwise noted, data are given for materials in their standard state (at 25 °C [77 °F], 100 kPa). Infobox references

Magnesium monoperoxyphthalate (MMPP) is a water-soluble peroxy acid used as an oxidant in organic synthesis. Its main areas of use are the conversion of ketones to esters (Baeyer-Villiger oxidation), epoxidation of alkenes (Prilezhaev reaction), oxidation of sulfides to sulfoxides and sulfones, oxidation of amines to produce amine oxides, and in the oxidative cleavage of hydrazones.

Due to its insolubility in non-polar solvents MMPP has seen less use than the more widely used meta-chloroperoxybenzoic acid (mCPBA). Although work up procedures are more simply handled in polar solvents, usage of MMPP to oxidize nonpolar substrates in biphasic media combined with a phase transfer catalyst have been inefficient. Despite this MMPP has certain advantages over mCPBA including a lower cost of production and increased stability.

MMPP is also used as the active ingredient in certain surface disinfectants such as Dismozon Pur. As a surface disinfectant MMPP exhibits a broad spectrum biocidal effect including inactivation of endospores. Its wide surface compatibility enables its use on sensitive materials, such as plastic and rubber equipment used in hospitals. Additionally MMPP has been investigated as a potential antibacterial agent for mouthwashes and toothpaste.
