= Cyclohexene oxide =

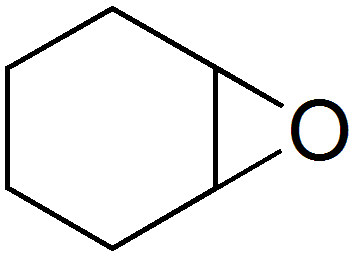

Names
- IUPAC name Epoxycyclohexane
- Other names 1,2-Epoxycyclohexane 7-Oxabicyclo[4.1.0]heptane

Identifiers
CAS Number	286-20-4
3D model (JSmol)	Interactive image
ChemSpider	8890
ECHA InfoCard	100.005.462
PubChem CID	9246
UNII	1XYE04C550
CompTox Dashboard (EPA)	DTXSID6024880
- InChI: InChI=1S/C6H10O/c1-2-4-6-5(3-1)7-6/h5-6H,1-4H2 Key: ZWAJLVLEBYIOTI-UHFFFAOYSA-N
- SMILES: C1CCC2C(C1)O2

Properties
Chemical formula	C_{6}H_{10}O
Molar mass	98.145 g·mol^{−1}
Appearance	Colorless liquid
Density	0.97 g·cm^{−3}
Melting point	ca. −40 °C
Boiling point	ca. 130 °C
Solubility in water	Practically insoluble
Vapor pressure	12 mbar (at 20 °C)
- Except where otherwise noted, data are given for materials in their standard state (at 25 °C [77 °F], 100 kPa). Infobox references

Cyclohexene oxide is a cycloaliphatic epoxide. It can react in cationic polymerization to poly(cyclohexene oxide). As cyclohexene is monovalent, poly(cyclohexene oxide) is a thermoplastic.

== Production ==
Cyclohexene oxide is produced in epoxidation reaction from cyclohexene. The epoxidation can take place either in a homogeneous reaction by peracids or heterogeneous catalysis (e.g. silver and molecular oxygen).

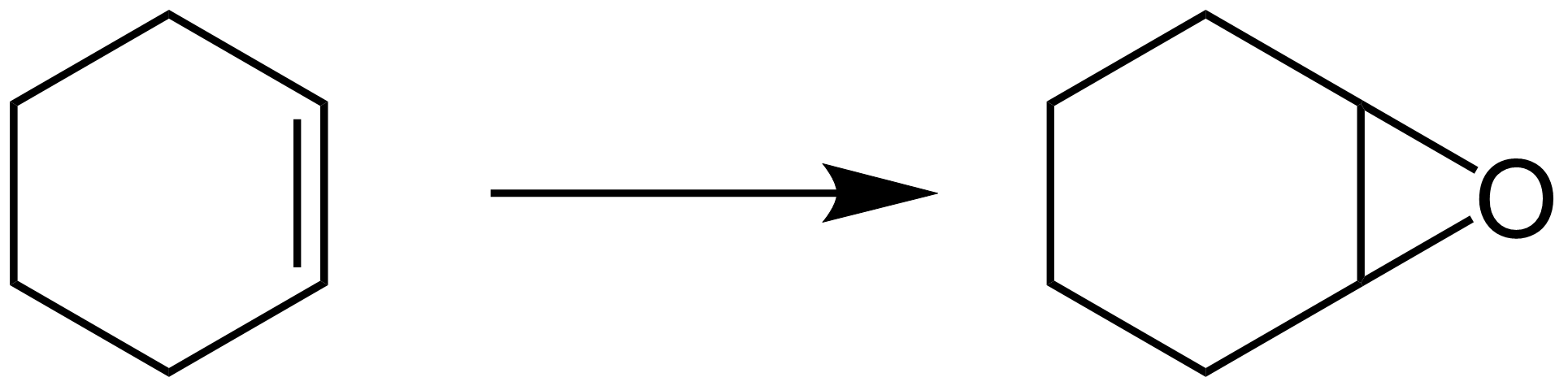

In industrial production the heterogeneously catalyzed synthesis is preferred because of better atom economy, a simpler separation of the product and easier recycling of catalyst. A short overview and an investigation of the oxidation of cyclohexene by hydrogen peroxide is given in the literature. In recent times the catalytic oxidation of cyclohexene by (immobilized) metalloporphyrin complexes has been found to be an efficient way.

In laboratory, cyclohexene oxide can also be prepared by reacting cyclohexene with magnesium monoperoxyphthalate (MMPP) in a mixture of isopropanol and water as solvent at room temperature.

With this method, good yields up to 85 % can be reached.

== Properties and reactions ==
Cyclohexene oxide has been studied extensively by analytical methods. Cyclohexene oxide can be polymerized in solution, catalyzed by a solid acid catalyst.
