= Polyatomic ion =

Ion containing two or more atoms

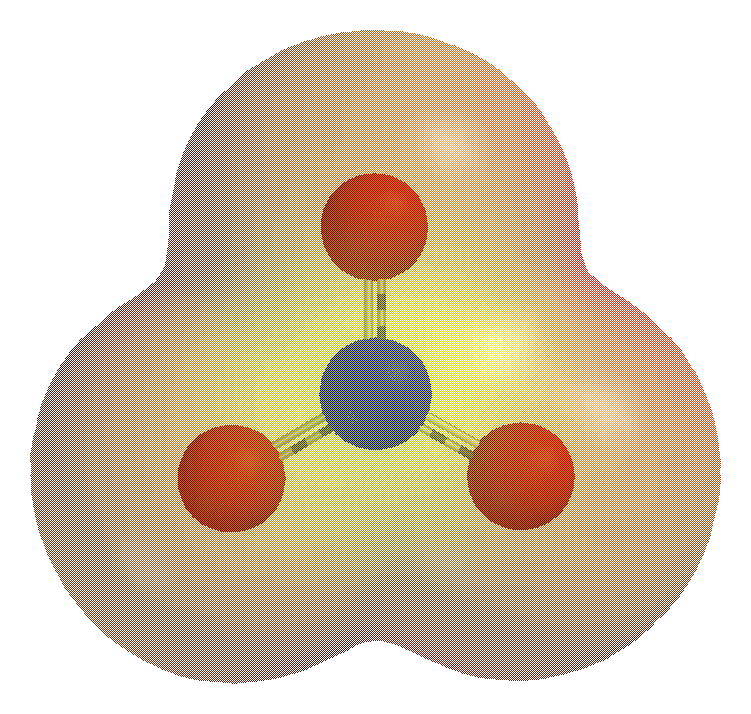
An electrostatic potential map of the nitrate ion (NO_{3}^{−}). Areas coloured translucent red, around the outside of the red oxygen atoms themselves, signify the regions of most negative electrostatic potential.

A polyatomic ion (also known as a molecular ion) is a covalent bonded set of two or more atoms, or of a metal complex, that can be considered to behave as a single unit and that usually has a net charge that is not zero, or in the special case of a zwitterion, where spatially separated charges may lead the net charge to be variable depending on acidity conditions. The term molecule may or may not be used to refer to a polyatomic ion, depending on the definition used. The prefix poly- carries the meaning "many" in Greek, but even ions of two atoms are commonly described as polyatomic. There may be more than one atom in the structure that has non-zero charge, therefore the net charge of the structure may have a cationic (positive) or anionic (negative) nature depending on those atomic details.

In older literature, a polyatomic ion may instead be referred to as a radical (or less commonly, as a radical group). In contemporary usage, the term radical refers to various free radicals, which are species that have an unpaired electron and need not be charged.

A simple example of a polyatomic ion is the hydroxide ion, which consists of one oxygen atom and one hydrogen atom, jointly carrying a net charge of −1; its chemical formula is OH^{−}. In contrast, an ammonium ion consists of one nitrogen atom and four hydrogen atoms, with a charge of +1; its chemical formula is NH_{4}^{+}.

Polyatomic ions often are useful in the context of acid–base chemistry and in the formation of salts.

Often, a polyatomic ion can be considered as the conjugate acid or base of a neutral molecule. For example, the conjugate base of sulfuric acid (H_{2}SO_{4}) is the polyatomic hydrogensulfate anion (HSO_{4}^{−}). The removal of another hydrogen ion produces the sulfate anion (SO_{4}^{2−}).

== Nomenclature of polyatomic anions ==
There are several patterns that can be used for learning the nomenclature of polyatomic anions. First, when the prefix bi is added to a name, a hydrogen is added to the ion's formula and its charge is increased by 1, the latter being a consequence of the hydrogen ion's +1 charge. An alternative to the bi- prefix is to use the word hydrogen in its place: the anion derived from H^{+}. For example, let us consider the carbonate(CO_{3}^{2−}) ion:

H^{+} + CO_{3}^{2−} → HCO_{3}^{−},

which is called either bicarbonate or hydrogencarbonate. The process that forms these ions is called protonation.

=== Naming oxyanions ===
Most of the common polyatomic anions are oxyanions, conjugate bases of oxyacids (acids derived from the oxides of non-metallic elements). For example, the sulfate anion, SO_{4}^{2−}, is derived from H_{2}SO_{4}, which can be regarded as SO_{3} + H_{2}O.

The second rule is based on the oxidation state of the central atom in the ion, which in practice is often (but not always) directly related to the number of oxygen atoms in the ion, following the pattern shown below. The following table shows the chlorine oxyanion family:

Oxidation state	−1	+1	+3	+5	+7
Anion name	chloride	hypochlorite	chlorite	chlorate	perchlorate
Formula	Cl^{−}	ClO^{−}	ClO_{2}^{−}	ClO_{3}^{−}	ClO_{4}^{−}
Structure	The chloride ion	The hypochlorite ion	The chlorite ion	The chlorate ion	The perchlorate ion

As the number of oxygen atoms bound to chlorine increases, the chlorine's oxidation number becomes more positive. This gives rise to the following common pattern: first, the -ate ion is considered to be the base name; adding a per- prefix adds an oxygen (or otherwise increases the oxidation state), while changing the -ate suffix to -ite will reduce the oxygens by one, and keeping the suffix -ite and adding the prefix hypo- reduces the number of oxygens by one more, all without changing the charge. The naming pattern follows within many different oxyanion series based on a standard root for that particular series. The -ite has one less oxygen than the -ate, but different -ate anions might have different numbers of oxygen atoms.

Generally, the change in prefix corresponds to a change in oxidation state. The main exception is the per- prefix, as only halogens and some transition metals can be oxidized to the +7 or greater oxidation states that would normally use per-. For other elements, it is used as shorthand for peroxy-, which has the same oxidation state as the prior -ate anion, but contains a peroxide group instead of a single oxygen. There are also cases where the oxidation state increases but the number of oxygen atoms does not, such as the oxidation of manganate (MnO_{4}^{2−}) to permanganate (MnO_{4}^{−}).

Some oxyanions form dimers, usually by losing an equivalent of oxide. These anions are given the prefix di- or pyro- (as many can be prepared by heating). These anions contain X−O−X bonds, and are structurally related to acid anhydrides of the conjugate acid. The pyro- prefix is only used for these kinds of dimers; others, such as hyponitrite, contain different bond structures despite having a formula that suggests it is "made" of two nitroxide units.

The following table shows the patterns of ion naming for some common ions and their derivatives. Exceptions to the rules are highlighted in yellow, while anions too unstable to exist are marked out with a red "none".

Element	Type of anion	Reduced anion		hypo-		-ite		-ate		per- or peroxy-	
Chlorine	All	Chloride	Cl^{−}	Hypochlorite	ClO^{−}	Chlorite	ClO_{2}^{−}	Chlorate	ClO_{3}^{−}	Perchlorate	ClO_{4}^{−}
Nitrogen	Simple anion	Nitride	N^{3−}	Nitroxide	NO^{−}	Nitrite	NO_{2}^{−}	Nitrate	NO_{3}^{−}	Peroxynitrate	NO_{4}^{−}
Nitrogen	Dimer	No dimer; azide trimer	N_{3}^{−}	Hyponitrite	N_{2}O_{2}^{2−}	None		None		None	
Sulfur	Simple anion	Sulfide	S^{2−}	Sulfoxylate	SO_{2}^{2−}	Sulfite	SO_{3}^{2−}	Sulfate	SO_{4}^{2−}	Persulfate or peroxysulfate	SO_{5}^{2−}
Sulfur	Protonated	Bisulfide	HS^{−}	Hydrogensulfoxylate	HSO_{2}^{−}	Bisulfite or hydrogensulfite	HSO_{3}^{−}	Bisulfate or hydrogensulfate	HSO_{4}^{−}	Hydrogenpersulfate	HSO_{5}^{−}
Sulfur	Dimer	Disulfide	S_{2}^{2−}	None		Pyrosulfite or disulfite	S_{2}O_{5}^{2−}	Pyrosulfate or disulfate	S_{2}O_{7}^{2−}	Peroxydisulfate	S_{2}O_{8}^{2−}
Phosphorus	Simple anion	Phosphide	P^{3−}	None		None		Phosphate or orthophosphate	PO_{4}^{3−}	Peroxymonophosphate	PO_{5}^{3−}
Phosphorus	Protonated once	None		None		Phosphite	HPO_{3}^{2−}	Hydrogenphosphate	HPO_{4}^{2−}	Hydrogenperoxymonophosphate	HPO_{5}^{2−}
Phosphorus	Protonated twice	Phosphanide	H_{2}P^{−}	Phosphinate or hypophosphite	H_{2}PO_{2}^{−}	Hydrogenphosphite	H_{2}PO_{3}^{−}	Dihydrogenphosphate	H_{2}PO_{4}^{−}	Dihydrogenperoxymonophosphate	H_{2}PO_{5}^{−}
Phosphorus	Dimer	No dimer; many other polyphosphides	P_{4}^{2−}, P_{7}^{3−}, P_{11}^{3−}, etc.	None		Diphosphite or pyrophosphite	H_{2}P_{2}O_{5}^{2−}	Diphosphate or pyrophosphate	P_{2}O_{7}^{4−}	Peroxydiphosphate	P_{4}O_{8}^{4−}

== Other examples of common polyatomic ions ==
The following tables give additional examples of commonly encountered polyatomic ions in various categories. Only a few representatives are given, as the number of polyatomic ions encountered in practice is very large.

Anions
Inorganic carbon anions		Alkoxides		Carboxylates		Transition metal oxyanions		Other notable anions	
Carbonate	CO_{3}^{2−}	Methoxide (methanolate)	CH_{3}O^{−}	Formate (methanoate)	HCOO^{−}	Manganate	MnO_{4}^{2−}	Hydroxide	OH^{−}
Bicarbonate or hydrogencarbonate	HCO_{3}^{−}	Ethoxide (ethanolate)	CH_{3}CH_{2}O^{−} or C_{2}H_{5}O^{−}	Acetate (ethanoate)	CH_{3}COO^{−} or C_{2}H_{3}O^{−}	Permanganate	MnO_{4}^{−}	Peroxide	O_{2}^{2−}
Acetylide	C_{2}^{2−}	Phenolate	C_{6}H_{5}O^{−}	Benzoate	C_{6}H_{5}COO^{−} or C_{7}H_{5}O_{2}^{−}	Chromate	CrO_{4}^{2−}	Superoxide	O_{2}^{−}
Cyanide	CN^{−}	tert-Butoxide	(CH_{3})_{3}CO^{−}	Oxalate	C_{2}O_{4}^{2−}	Dichromate	Cr_{2}O_{7}^{2−}	Azanide	NH_{2}^{−}
Cyanate	OCN^{−}			Citrate	C_{6}H_{5}O_{7}^{3−}	Orthotungstate	WO_{4}^{2−}	Orthosilicate	SiO_{4}^{4−}
Thiocyanate	SCN^{−}							Borohydride	BH_{4}^{−}

Cations
Onium ions		Carbenium ions		Others	
Guanidinium	C(NH_{2})^{+}_{3}	Tropylium	C_{7}H_{7}^{+}	Mercury(I)	Hg_{2}^{2+}
Ammonium	NH_{4}^{+}	Triphenylcarbenium	(C_{6}H_{5})_{3}C^{+}	Dihydrogen	H_{2}^{+}
Phosphonium	PH_{4}^{+}	Cyclopropenium	C_{3}H_{3}^{+}		
Hydronium	H_{3}O^{+}	Trifluoromethyl	CF_{3}^{+}		
Fluoronium	H_{2}F^{+}				
Pyrylium	C_{5}H_{5}O^{+}				
Sulfonium	H_{3}S^{+}				

== Zwitterion and polycharged polyatomic ions ==
Many polyatomic molecules can carry spatially separated charges, forming polycharged polyatomic ions. An important case of these compounds are zwitterions, which are neutral compounds but have opposing formal charges within the same molecule. A typical example are amino acids, which carry both charged amino and carboxyl groups. These charges can influence the chemical and physical properties of substances.

Many zwitterions exhibit tautomerism with a "parent" molecule without formal charges. For example, glycine reversibly converts between the parent molecule and a zwitterionic form by transfer of a labile hydrogen atom between the protonated amino group and carboxylate group. By contrast, trimethylglycine has three non-labile methyl groups, making quaternary ammonium, so it does not interconvert with the non-zwitterionic isomer (a dimethylglycine ester). These non-tautomeric zwitterions are called betaines.

== See also ==
- Monatomic ion
- Protonation
- Onium ion
