= C9H12O =

The molecular formula C_{9}H_{12}O (molar mass: 136.19 g/mol, exact mass: 136.0888 u) may refer to:

- Mesitol (2,4,6-trimethylphenol)
- 2-Phenyl-2-propanol
- 2,3,6-Trimethylphenol
