= Pyridine-N-oxide =

Chemical compound (C5H5NO)

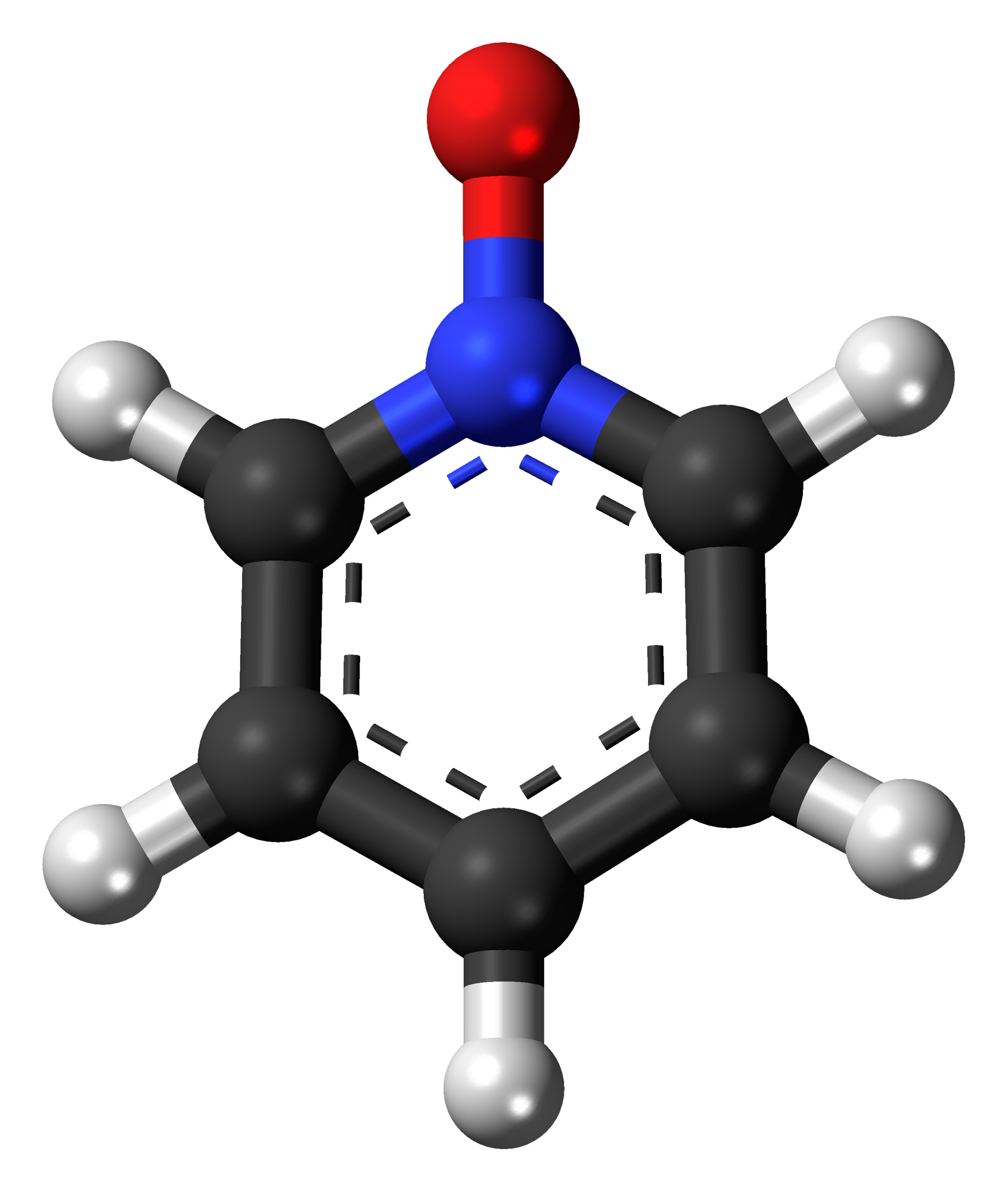

Names
- Preferred IUPAC name 1λ^{5}-Pyridin-1-one
- Other names Pyridine-1-oxide

Identifiers
CAS Number	694-59-7
3D model (JSmol)	Interactive image
ChEBI	CHEBI:29136
ChEMBL	ChEMBL3278446
ChemSpider	12229
ECHA InfoCard	100.010.705
EC Number	211-774-6
PubChem CID	12753
UNII	91F12JJJ4H
CompTox Dashboard (EPA)	DTXSID3061007
- InChI: InChI=1S/C5H5NO/c7-6-4-2-1-3-5-6/h1-5H Key: ILVXOBCQQYKLDS-UHFFFAOYSA-N; InChI=1/C5H5NO/c7-6-4-2-1-3-5-6/h1-5H Key: ILVXOBCQQYKLDS-UHFFFAOYAZ
- SMILES: c1cc[n+](cc1)[O-]

Properties
Chemical formula	C_{5}H_{5}NO
Molar mass	95.101 g·mol^{−1}
Appearance	Colourless solid
Melting point	65 to 66 °C (149 to 151 °F; 338 to 339 K)
Boiling point	270 °C (518 °F; 543 K)
Solubility in water	high
Acidity (pK_{a})	0.8 (of conjugate acid)
- Except where otherwise noted, data are given for materials in their standard state (at 25 °C [77 °F], 100 kPa). verify (what is ?) Infobox references

Pyridine-N-oxide is the heterocyclic compound with the formula C_{5}H_{5}NO. This colourless, hygroscopic solid is the product of the oxidation of pyridine. Its synthesis was first reported by Jakob Meisenheimer, who used peroxybenzoic acid as the oxidant. The compound is used infrequently as an oxidizing reagent in organic synthesis.

== Structure ==
The structure of pyridine-N-oxide is very similar to that of pyridine with respect to the parameters for the ring. The molecule is planar. The N–O distance is 1.34 Å. The C–N–C angle is 124°, 7° wider than in pyridine.

== Synthesis ==
The oxidation of pyridine can be achieved with a number of peroxy acids, including peracetic acid and peroxybenzoic acid. Oxidation can also be effected by a modified Dakin reaction using a urea–hydrogen peroxide complex, sodium perborate in acetic acid, catalytic methylrhenium trioxide (CH_{3}ReO_{3}) with sodium percarbonate or dimethyldioxirane.

Routes to pyridine-N-oxide.

Alternatively, glutaconaldehyde condenses with hydroxylamine to give pyridine N-oxide.

== Reactions ==
Pyridine N-oxide is five orders of magnitude less basic than pyridine: the pK_{a} of protonated pyridine-N-oxide is 0.8. Protonated derivatives are nevertheless isolable, e.g., [C_{5}H_{5}NOH]Cl. Further demonstrating its (feeble) basicity, pyridine-N-oxide also serves as a ligand in coordination chemistry. A host of transition metal complexes of pyridine-N-oxides are known.

Some electrophilic substitutions on pyridine rings are usefully effected using pyridine N-oxide followed by deoxygenation. The oxygen suppresses reaction at nitrogen atom and promotes substitution at the 2- and 4-carbons, particularly the 4 carbon. For example, 4-nitropyridine can be prepared from nitrating pyridine-N-oxide and subsequent deoxygenation with PCl_{3}. Deoxygenation can also be carried out with POCl_{3} to give 2-chloropyridines.

Preparation of 4-nitropyridine.

The ortho and para positions of pyridine-N-oxide derivatives are also active in nucleophilic substitution to a Polonovski reaction-like product.

Pyridine N-oxide is rather resistant to reduction. The electrochemical (half-wave) reduction potential is about -1.4 V relative to the saturated calomel electrode at neutral pH, rising to about -1.3 V at pH 3.5. For comparison, aliphatic and polyarene amine oxides are generally reduced between -0.2 and -0.8 V.

== Related pyridine-N-oxides ==
Pyridine-N-oxides are uncommon in nature. 2-(Methyldithio)pyridine-N-oxide and related compounds have been isolated from species of Allium.

The N-oxides of various pyridines are precursors to useful drugs:

- Nicotinic acid N-oxide, derived from nicotinic acid is a precursor to niflumic acid and pranoprofen.
- 2,3,5-Trimethylpyridine N-oxide is a precursor to the drug omeprazole
- 2-Chloropyridine N-oxide is a precursor to the fungicide zinc pyrithione

== Safety ==
The compound is a skin irritant.

== See also ==
- Pyridinium
