= Peroxyureidoacrylate/ureidoacrylate amidohydrolase =

Identifiers
- EC no.: 3.5.1.110

Databases
- BRENDA: enzyme data
- ExPASy: NiceZyme view
- KEGG: enzyme entry
- MetaCyc: metabolic pathway
- Rhea: reactions
- PDB structures: RCSB PDB PDBe PDBsum
Search
- PMC: articles
- PubMed: articles
- NCBI: proteins

Peroxyureidoacrylate/ureidoacrylate amidohydrolase (EC 3.5.1.110, gene RutB) is an enzyme characterised from Escherichia coli with systematic name (Z)-3-ureidoacrylate peracid amidohydrolase. It catalyses the two related hydrolysis reactions.

The overall effect of the first example is to convert ureidoacrylic acid to (Z)-3-aminoacrylic acid, with ammonia and carbon dioxide as byproducts:

ureidoacrylic acid
H_{2}O
NH_{3}
(Z)-3-aminoacrylic acid
+ CO_{2}

The starting material is a breakdown product of the nucleotide base, uracil produced by an earlier step in the pathway, catalysed by pyrimidine oxygenase, the RutA gene. The initial product of that enzyme is the peracid of ureidoacrylic acid, to which it spontaneously converts.

Pyrimidine oxygenase can also use thymine as a substrate and in that case its product is (Z)-2-methylureidoacrylic acid, which RutB converts to (Z)-3-amino-2-methylacrylic acid:

(Z)-2-methylureidoacrylic acid
H_{2}O
NH_{3}
(Z)-3-amino-2-methylacrylic acid
+ CO_{2}

Both (Z)-3-aminoacrylic acid and (Z)-3-amino-2-methylacrylic acid are enamines which spontaneously hydrolyse to aldehydes and ammonia. The sequence of reactions allows E. coli to grow on uracil as the sole nitrogen source.
