= Hydroxylated lecithin =

Hydroxylated Lecithin
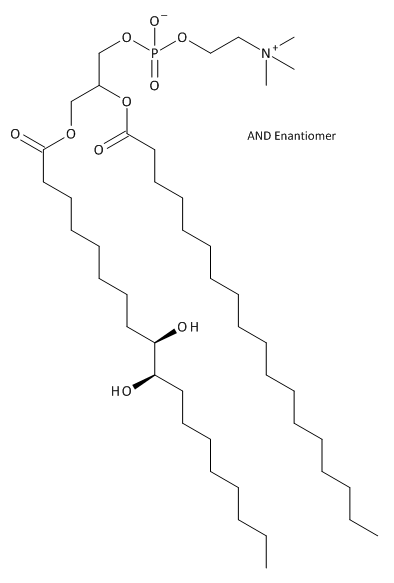
- Hydroxylated Lecithin

Names
- IUPAC name [3-[(9R,10R)-9,10-dihydroxyoctadecanoyl]oxy-2-octadecanoyloxy-propyl] 2-(trimethylammonio)ethyl phosphate

Identifiers
CAS Number	8029-76-3
3D model (JSmol)	Interactive image
ECHA InfoCard	100.029.486
EC Number	232-440-6
PubChem CID	57508518
CompTox Dashboard (EPA)	DTXSID1093751
- InChI: InChI=1S/C44H88NO10P/c1-6-8-10-12-14-15-16-17-18-19-20-21-22-26-31-35-44(49)55-40(39-54-56(50,51)53-37-36-45(3,4)5)38-52-43(48)34-30-27-23-25-29-33-42(47)41(46)32-28-24-13-11-9-7-2/h40-42,46-47H,6-39H2,1-5H3/t40?,41-,42-/m1/s1 Key: XSEOYPMPHHCUBN-FGYWBSQSSA-N
- SMILES: CCCCCCCCCCCCCCCCCC(=O)OC(COC(=O)CCCCCCC[C@H]([C@@H](CCCCCCCC)O)O)COP(=O)([O-])OCC[N+](C)(C)C

Properties
Chemical formula	C_{44}H_{88}NO_{10}P
Molar mass	822.159 g·mol^{−1}
Appearance	yellow-orange viscous liquid
- Except where otherwise noted, data are given for materials in their standard state (at 25 °C [77 °F], 100 kPa). verify (what is ?) Infobox references

Hydroxylated lecithin is chemically modified lecithin. It is made by treating lecithin with hydrogen peroxide and an organic acid such as acetic or lactic acid. In the process, some of the organic acid becomes peroxy acid. The peroxy acid reacts with olefins in the fatty acid side chains creating intermediate epoxides. The epoxides react further with water, organic acid, or peroxy acid, to ultimately form vicinal diols. Because the natural fatty acid olefins have (Z)-configurations, the resulting vicinal diols have anti stereochemical configurations.

Fatty acids with hydroxyl groups on their hydrophobic tails are rare in nature. Compare hydroxylated lecithin to castor oil, which has 3 hydroxylated fatty acid chains in it. Hydroxyl groups give these oils unique polar properties that make them useful in a variety of applications, including cosmetics, pharmaceuticals, and foods.

== Synthesis ==
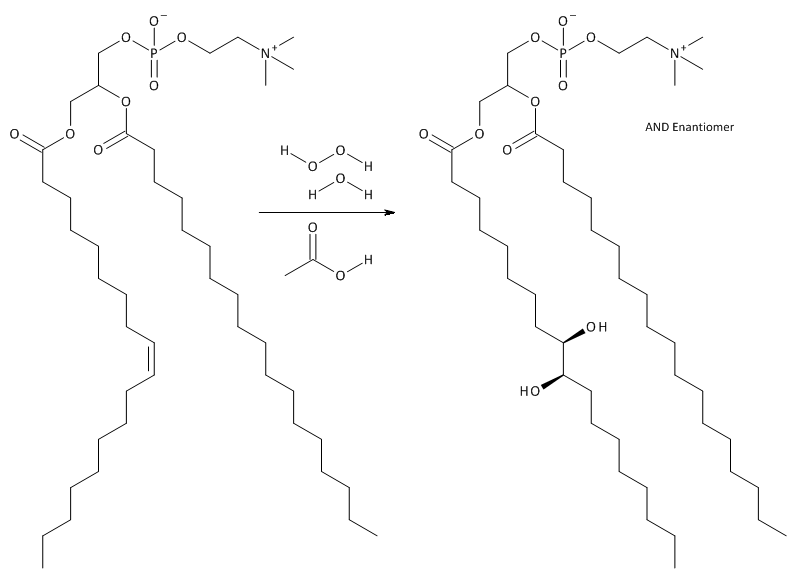
