= Styrene oxide =

Chemical compound

Names
- Preferred IUPAC name Phenyloxirane
- Other names Epoxystyrene; Styryl oxide; Phenylethylene oxide

Identifiers
CAS Number	96-09-3
3D model (JSmol)	Interactive image
Beilstein Reference	108582
ChEBI	CHEBI:17907
ChemSpider	7005
ECHA InfoCard	100.002.252
EC Number	202-476-7
Gmelin Reference	50213
KEGG	C02083
PubChem CID	7276
RTECS number	CZ9625000
UNII	9QH06NGT6O
UN number	2810 3082
CompTox Dashboard (EPA)	DTXSID2021286
- InChI: InChI=1S/C8H8O/c1-2-4-7(5-3-1)8-6-9-8/h1-5,8H,6H2 Key: AWMVMTVKBNGEAK-UHFFFAOYSA-N
- SMILES: c1ccccc1C2CO2

Properties
Chemical formula	C_{8}H_{8}O
Molar mass	120.151 g·mol^{−1}
Appearance	Colorless to light yellow liquid
Density	1.052 g/mL
Melting point	−37 °C (−35 °F; 236 K)
Boiling point	194 °C (381 °F; 467 K)

Hazards
- GHS labelling
Pictograms	(GHS07: Exclamation mark) (GHS08: Health hazard)
Signal word	Danger
Hazard statements	H312, H319, H350
Precautionary statements	P201, P202, P264, P280, P281, P302+P352, P305+P351+P338, P308+P313, P312, P322, P337+P313, P363, P405, P501
Safety data sheet (SDS)	Oxford University MSDS
- Except where otherwise noted, data are given for materials in their standard state (at 25 °C [77 °F], 100 kPa). verify (what is ?) Infobox references

Styrene oxide is an epoxide derived from styrene. Its chemical formula is C_{6}H_{5}C_{2}H_{3}O and it has two enantiomeric forms. It can be prepared by epoxidation of styrene with peroxybenzoic acid, in the Prilezhaev reaction:

Styrene oxide is slightly soluble in water. A trace amount of acid in water causes hydrolysis to racemic styrene glycol via a benzylic cation. If the amount of water is not sufficient, acid-catalyzed isomerization to phenylacetaldehyde will occur.

Styrene oxide in the body is metabolized to mandelic acid, phenylglyoxylic acid, benzoic acid and hippuric acid.

Hydrogenation of styrene oxide affords phenethyl alcohol.

== Stereospecific reactions ==
Since styrene oxide has a chiral center at the benzylic carbon atom, there are (R)-styrene oxide and (S)-styrene oxide.

== Toxicology ==
Styrene oxide is a main metabolite of styrene in humans or animals, resulting from oxidation by cytochrome P450. It is considered possibly carcinogenic from gavaging significant amounts into mice and rats. Styrene oxide is subsequently hydrolyzed in vivo to styrene glycol by epoxide hydrolase.

Styrene oxide has a chiral center and thus two enantiomers. It has been reported that the two enantiomers had different toxicokinetics and toxicity. It was reported that the (R)-styrene oxide was preferentially formed in mice, especially in the lung, whereas the (S)-styrene oxide was preferentially generated in rats. In human volunteers, the cumulative excretion of the (S)-enantiomer of styrene glycol and mandelic acid were higher than the R form after exposure to styrene. In human liver microsomes, cytochrome P450-mediated styrene oxidation showed the production of more S enantiomer relative to the R enantiomer. It was also found that (S)-styrene oxide was preferentially hydrolyzed than the R enantiomer in human liver microsomes. Animal studies have shown that the (R)-enantiomer of styrene oxide was more toxic than the (S)-enantiomer in mice.
