= Pyrimidine oxygenase =

Class of enzymes

Identifiers
- EC no.: 1.14.99.46

Databases
- BRENDA: enzyme data
- ExPASy: NiceZyme view
- KEGG: enzyme entry
- MetaCyc: metabolic pathway
- Rhea: reactions
- PDB structures: RCSB PDB PDBe PDBsum
Search
- PMC: articles
- PubMed: articles
- NCBI: proteins

Pyrimidine oxygenase (EC 1.14.99.46, gene RutA) is an enzyme characterised from Escherichia coli with systematic name uracil,FMNH_{2}:oxygen oxidoreductase (uracil hydroxylating, ring-opening). It catalyses two related oxidation reactions which act on pyrimidine nucleobases.

The overall effect of the first example is to convert uracil to (Z)-3-ureidoacrylic acid with molecular oxygen as the oxidant and flavin mononucleotide (FMN) as a cofactor. The enzyme also requires nicotinamide adenine dinucleotide (NADH):

uracil
+ FMNH2
+ NADH
O_{2}
H_{2}O + H^{+}
(Z)-3-ureidoacrylic acid
+ FMN
+ NAD+

The initial product of that enzyme is the peracid of ureidoacrylic acid, to which it spontaneously converts.

Pyrimidine oxygenase can also use thymine as a substrate and in that case its product is (Z)-2-methylureidoacrylic acid:

thymine
+ FMNH2
+ NADH
O_{2}
H_{2}O + H^{+}
(Z)-2-methylureidoacrylic acid
+ FMN
+ NAD+

In the full pathway, the next step is catalysed by ureidoacrylate amidohydrolase and the sequence of reactions allows E. coli to grow on uracil as the sole nitrogen source.
