= Nikolai Prilezhaev =

Nikolai Alexandrovich Prilezhaev, Russian: Николай Александрович Прилежаев, (Born September 15 [O.S. 27], 1887 in Kopossevo near Nizhny Novgorod, died May 26, 1944, in Moscow) was a Russian organic chemist. The Prilezhaev reaction, in which an alkene and a peroxyacid react to form an epoxide, is named after him.

Prilezhaev was the son of a clergyman and studied chemistry at the Theological Seminary in Warsaw (graduated in 1895) and then at the University of Warsaw under the supervision of Yegor Yegorovich Vagner (Georg Wagner). After graduating in 1900 he was assistant professor of organic chemistry at the Polytechnic in Warsaw where he belonged to the school of organic chemistry founded by Wagner. After earning a master's degree in 1912 in St. Petersburg, he became an associate professor of organic chemistry at the University of Warsaw. In 1915 he became a professor at the Polytechnic in Kiev and 1924 at the University of Minsk. There he established the Faculty of Chemistry and between 1931 and 1933 was director of the Institute of Chemistry of the Belarusian Academy of Sciences.

He dealt mostly with oxidation processes, following in the footsteps of chemists such as Alexei Nikolaevich Bach. For example, he studied reactions between unsaturated compounds and peroxides. He discovered the Prilezhaev reaction in 1908 and continued to study its intermediates and products.

He was a corresponding member of the Soviet Academy of Sciences (1933) and a member of the Belarusian Academy of Sciences (1940). In 1912 he received the Butlerov Prize.

== Bibliography ==
- Winfried R. Pötsch u. a.: Priležaev, Nikolaj Aleksandrovič. In: Lexikon bedeutender Chemiker. 1. Auflage. Bibliographisches Institut, Leipzig 1988, ISBN 3-323-00185-0, S. 351.
