= Androst-4-ene-3,17-dione monooxygenase =

Identifiers
- EC no.: 1.14.99.12
- CAS no.: 37256-74-9

Databases
- IntEnz: IntEnz view
- BRENDA: BRENDA entry
- ExPASy: NiceZyme view
- KEGG: KEGG entry
- MetaCyc: metabolic pathway
- PRIAM: profile
- PDB structures: RCSB PDB PDBe PDBsum
- Gene Ontology: AmiGO / QuickGO
Search
- PMC: articles
- PubMed: articles
- NCBI: proteins

Androst-4-ene-3,17-dione monooxygenase (EC 1.14.99.12) is an enzyme that catalyzes the chemical reaction

androstenedione
+ reduced
acceptor
O_{2}
H_{2}O
testololactone
+ electron
acceptor

The three substrates of this enzyme are the steroid hormone, androstenedione, a reduced electron acceptor, and oxygen. Its products are testololactone, the electron acceptor, and water.

This enzyme is an oxidoreductase that uses molecular oxygen to carry out a Baeyer–Villiger oxidation. The systematic name of this enzyme class is androst-4-ene-3,17-dione-hydrogen-donor:oxygen oxidorcockeductase (13-hydroxylating, lactonizing). Other names in common use include androstene-3,17-dione hydroxylase, androst-4-ene-3,17-dione 17-oxidoreductase, androst-4-ene-3,17-dione hydroxylase, androstenedione monooxygenase, and 4-androstene-3,17-dione monooxygenase.
