= Meisenheimer rearrangement =

Named after	Jakob Meisenheimer
Reaction type	Rearrangement reaction

In organic chemistry, the Meisenheimer rearrangement is the conversion of a tertiary amine oxide to a alkoxylamine. The reaction is most common for benzylic or allylic amine oxides. The reaction is names for Jakob Meisenheimer. The process resembles the oxy-Cope rearrangement.

The 1,2-rearrangement:

The 2,3-rearrangement:
