= Peroxymonophosphoric acid =

Oxyacid of phosphorus

Names
- IUPAC name peroxyphosphoric acid
- Systematic IUPAC name (dioxidanido)dihydroxidooxidophosphorus
- Other names: monoperoxyphosphoric acid; permonophosphoric acid; peroxomonophosphoric acid; PMPA

Identifiers
CAS Number	13598-52-2
3D model (JSmol)	Interactive image
ChEBI	CHEBI:29282
ChEMBL	ChEMBL1162310
ChemSpider	4885506
PubChem CID	6326786
CompTox Dashboard (EPA)	DTXSID70422533
- InChI: InChI=1S/H3O5P/c1-5-6(2,3)4/h1H,(H2,2,3,4) Key: MPNNOLHYOHFJKL-UHFFFAOYSA-N; InChI=1S/H3O5P/c1-5-6(2,3)4/h1H,(H2,2,3,4)
- SMILES: OOP(=O)(O)O

Properties
Chemical formula	H_{3}PO_{5}
Molar mass	114.00 g/mol
Appearance	colorless oil
Solubility	soluble in acetonitrile, dioxane

Related compounds
Related compounds	peroxydiphosphoric acid; phosphoric acid
- Except where otherwise noted, data are given for materials in their standard state (at 25 °C [77 °F], 100 kPa). Infobox references

Peroxymonophosphoric acid (H_{3}PO_{5}) is an oxyacid of phosphorus. It is a colorless viscous oil. Its salts are called peroxymonophosphates. Another peroxyphosphoric acid is peroxydiphosphoric acid, H_{4}P_{2}O_{8}.

== Preparation ==
Peroxyphosphoric acids were first synthesized and characterized in 1910 by Julius Schmidlin and Paul Massini via the reaction between phosphorus pentoxide and highly-concentrated aqueous solution of hydrogen peroxide. However, this reaction proceeds very vigorously and is difficult to control. Aside from phosphorus pentoxide, syntheses from metaphosphoric acid and diphosphoric acid were also reported.

P_{2}O_{5} + 2 H_{2}O_{2} + H_{2}O → 2 H_{3}PO_{5}
H_{4}P_{4}O_{12} + 4 H_{2}O_{2} → 4 H_{3}PO_{5}
H_{4}P_{2}O_{7} + H_{2}O_{2} → H_{3}PO_{5} + H_{3}PO_{4}

A less vigorous method of preparing peroxyphosphoric acid by introducing the inert solvent acetonitrile was described by Gerrit Toennies in 1937. This method was shown to be unsuitable in diethyl ether or isoamyl alcohol.

=== Contemporary methods ===
Peroxyphosphoric acid is usually produced by treating phosphorus pentoxide and concentrated hydrogen peroxide within an inert solvent like acetonitrile or carbon tetrachloride.

P_{4}O_{10} + 4 H_{2}O_{2} + 2 H_{2}O → 4 H_{3}PO_{5}

One method of preparation is the hydrolysis of potassium of lithium peroxydiphosphate in a strong acid such as perchloric acid. The peroxydiphosphate salts can be obtained by electrolysis of their respective phosphate salts.

(P_{2}O_{8})^{4−} + H_{2}O + 4 H^{+} → H_{3}PO_{5} + H_{3}PO_{4}

Peroxydiphosphoric acid is obtained when phosphoric acid is treated with fluorine or oxidized electrolytically.

== Properties ==
The structure of H_{3}PO_{5}, displaying the intramolecular hydrogen bond

Peroxymonophosphoric acid is a colorless, viscous liquid. It is stabilized by an intramolecular hydrogen bond. The compound is a triprotic acid with acid dissociation constants pK_{a1} = 1.1, pK_{a2} = 5.5 and pK_{a3} = 12.8. In aqueous solutions it slowly undergoes hydrolysis to hydrogen peroxide and phosphoric acid.

H_{3}PO_{5} + H_{2}O → H_{3}PO_{4} + H_{2}O_{2}

With excess water, the hydrolysis can be considered pseudo-first order. The half-life for this decomposition is dependent on the pH and temperature, being about 31 hours at 35 °C and 2.5 hours at 61 °C. A solution in acetonitrile also slowly degrades, losing 30% of active oxygen after 26 days of storage at 5 °C. Relatively stable salts can be obtained by neutralization with bases, for example with potassium hydroxide to give the hygroscopic potassium dihydrogenperoxymonophosphate KH_{2}PO_{5}.

== Uses and reactions ==
Peroxyphosphoric acids and peroxyphosphates have few commercial uses.

=== Reactions with organic compounds ===
They have been examined in the context of organic synthesis, as an electrophilic reagent for the oxidation of alkenes, alkynes, aromatic compounds and amines. Due to the strongly acidic nature, only relatively acid-stable epoxides can be prepared from alkenes, for example trans-stilbene oxide from trans-stilbene. Less stable epoxides are cleaved or react further; cyclohexene, styrene, and α-methylstyrene yield no isolable epoxides. In the cases of styrene and α-methylstyrene, acid-catalyzed alkyl migrations lead instead to the main products phenylacetic acid and 2-phenylpropionic acid, respectively.

The oxidation of diphenylacetylene at room temperature yields benzil, presumably through an oxirene intermediate.

Peroxymonophosphoric acid is an effective reagent for the hydroxylation of aromatic rings. The conversion of mesitylene to mesitol can be achieved at room temperature in less than four hours.

The compound can be used as an effective oxidizing agent for the Baeyer-Villiger oxidation. Substituted acetophenones can be converted to the corresponding phenyl acetates at 30 °C in high yields. The rate is about 100 times higher in comparison to using peroxybenzoic acid.

Tertiary aromatic amines like dimethylaniline are oxidized to the corresponding amine oxide.

Oxidation of THF with peroxymonophosphoric acid gives γ-butyrolactone.
