= PAMO =

PAMO may refer to:

- Mountain Village Airport, ICAO code
- Phenylacetone monooxygenase, an enzyme
