= Phenylacetone monooxygenase =

Class of enzymes

Identifiers
- EC no.: 1.14.13.92

Databases
- IntEnz: IntEnz view
- BRENDA: BRENDA entry
- ExPASy: NiceZyme view
- KEGG: KEGG entry
- MetaCyc: metabolic pathway
- PRIAM: profile
- PDB structures: RCSB PDB PDBe PDBsum
Search
- PMC: articles
- PubMed: articles
- NCBI: proteins

Phenylacetone monooxygenase (EC 1.14.13.92) is an enzyme that catalyzes the chemical reaction

phenylacetone
+ NADPH + H^{+}
O_{2}
H_{2}O
benzyl acetate
+ NADP^{+}

The four substrates of this enzyme are phenylacetone, reduced nicotinamide adenine dinucleotide phosphate (NADPH), oxygen, and a proton. Its products are benzyl acetate, oxidised NADP^{+}, and water.

This enzyme is a flavoprotein of Baeyer-Villiger monooxygenase type, which uses molecular oxygen as oxidant and incorporates one of its atoms into the starting material. The systematic name of this enzyme class is phenylacetone,NADPH:oxygen oxidoreductase. This enzyme is also called PAMO.
