= Meisenheimer complex =

Class of organic compounds

A Meisenheimer complex or Jackson–Meisenheimer complex in organic chemistry is an 1:1 reaction adduct between an arene carrying electron withdrawing groups and a nucleophile. These complexes are found as reactive intermediates in nucleophilic aromatic substitution but stable and isolated Meisenheimer salts are also known. It is an anionic structure, in contrast to the arenium ion intermediate in electrophilic aromatic substitution that is cationic.

== Background ==
The early development of this type of complex takes place around the turn of the 19th century. In 1886 Janovski observed an intense violet color when he mixed meta-dinitrobenzene with an alcoholic solution of alkali. In 1895 Cornelis Adriaan Lobry van Troostenburg de Bruyn investigated a red substance formed in the reaction of trinitrobenzene with potassium hydroxide in methanol. In 1900 Jackson and Gazzolo reacted trinitroanisole with sodium methoxide and proposed a quinoid structure for the reaction product.

In 1902 Jakob Meisenheimer observed that by acidifying their reaction product, the starting material was recovered.

With three electron withdrawing groups, the negative charge in the complex is located at one of the nitro groups according to the quinoid model. When less electron poor arenes this charge is delocalized over the entire ring (structure to the right in scheme 1).

In one study a Meisenheimer arene (4,6-dinitrobenzofuroxan) was allowed to react with a strongly electron-releasing arene (1,3,5-tris(N-pyrrolidinyl)benzene) forming a zwitterionic Meisenheimer–Wheland complex. The Wheland intermediate is the name typically given to the cationic reactive intermediate formed in electrophilic aromatic substitution, and can be considered an oppositely charged analog of the negatively charged Meisenheimer complex formed in nucleophilic aromatic substitution. Hence, the simultaneous occurrence of the Wheland and Meisenheimer intermediates in the single zwitterionic complex shown below led to its description as a Meisenheimer–Wheland complex.

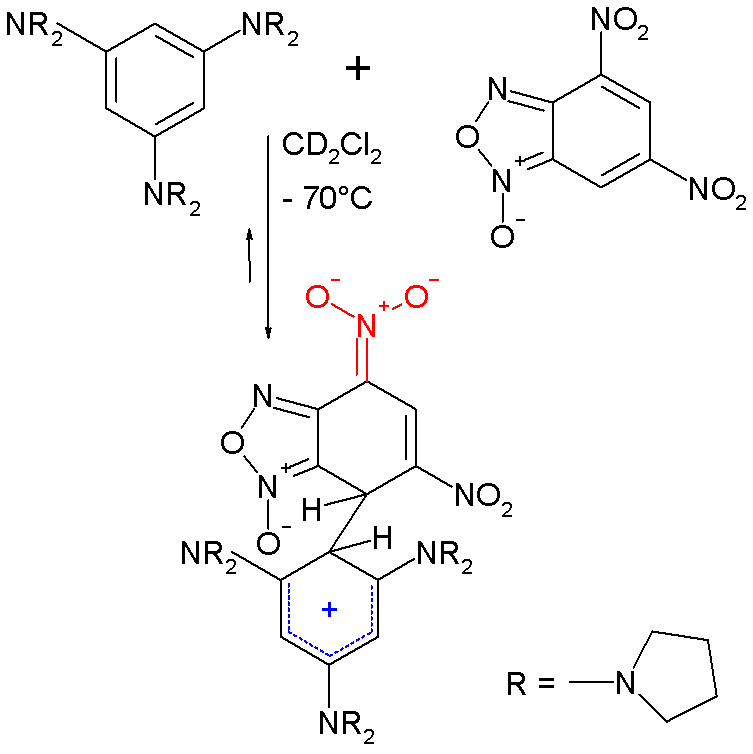

The structure of this complex was confirmed by NMR spectroscopy.

== Janovski reaction ==
The Janovski reaction is the reaction of 1,3-dinitrobenzene with an enolizable ketone to the Meisenheimer adduct.

== Zimmermann reaction ==
In the Zimmermann reaction the Janovski adduct is oxidized with excess base to a strongly colored enolate with subsequent reduction of the dinitro compound to the aromatic nitro amine. This reaction is the basis of the Zimmermann test used for the detection of ketosteroids.

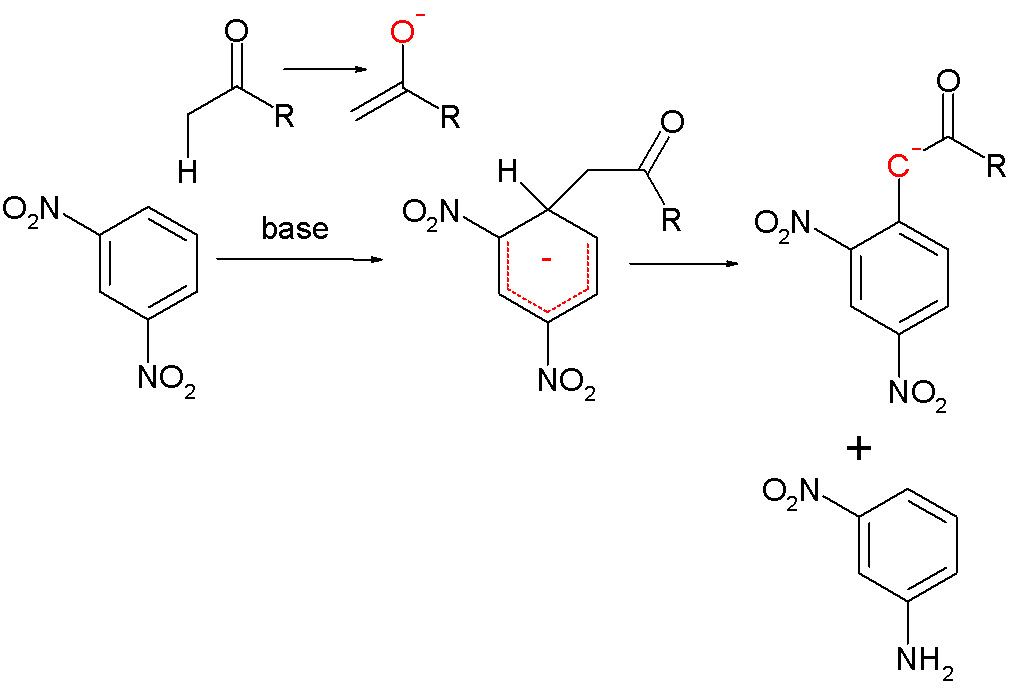

== Eponyms ==
The Jackson–Meisenheimer complex was named after the American organic chemist, Charles Loring Jackson (1847–1935) and the German organic chemist, Jakob Meisenheimer (1876–1934).

The Janovski reaction was named for the Czech chemist, Jaroslav Janovski (1850–1907).

The Zimmermann reaction was named after the German chemist, Wilhelm Zimmermann (1910–1982).

Lastly, the Wheland intermediate was named after the American chemist, George Willard Wheland (1907–1976)
