= Trimethylphenol =

Trimethylphenol may refer to:

- 2,3,4-Trimethylphenol
- 2,3,5-Trimethylphenol
- 2,3,6-Trimethylphenol
- 2,4,5-Trimethylphenol
- 2,4,6-Trimethylphenol
- 3,4,5-Trimethylphenol
