= Transition metal complexes of pyridine-N-oxides and amine oxides =

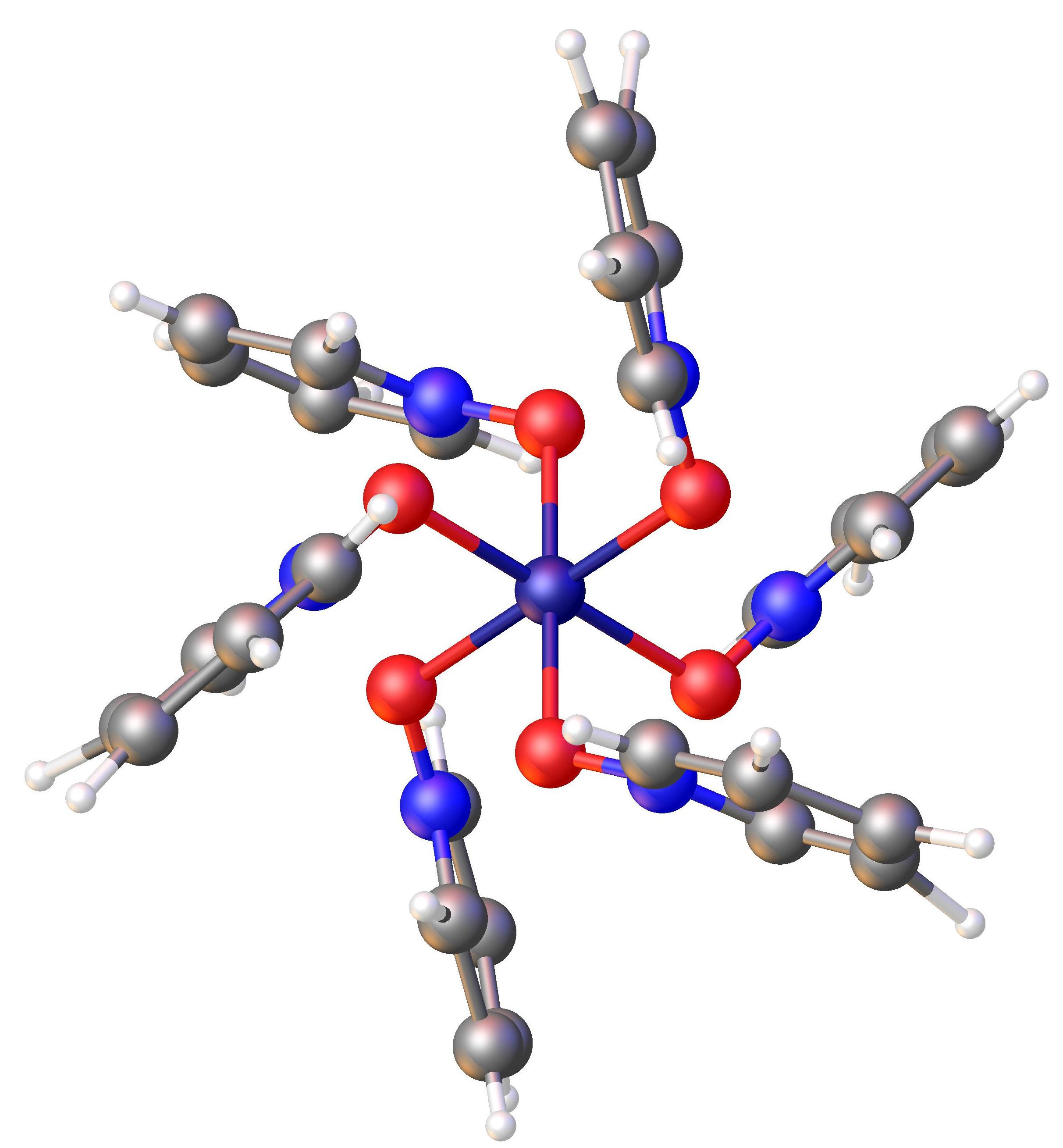
Structure of [Ni(ONC_{5}H_{5})_{6}]^{2+}.

Transition metal complexes of pyridine-N-oxides encompass coordination complexes that contain pyridine-N-oxides as ligands. Transition metal complexes of amine-N-oxides encompass coordination complexes that contain amine oxides as ligands. The two classes of complexes are similar.

== Bonding ==
Pyridine-N-oxides and amine oxides are classified as L ligands in the covalent bond classification method. In the usual electron counting method, they are two-electron ligands. With respect to HSAB theory, they are classified aa hard, as is typical for oxygen-based ligands.

Amine oxides are moderate bases. For (CH_{3})_{3}NOH^{+}, the pK_{a} is around 9.7. Pyridine-N-oxides are significantly weaker bases.

== Pyridine-N-oxides ==
Particularly common are the octahedral homoleptic complexes of the type [M(ONC_{5}H_{5})_{6}]^{2+} where M = Mn(II), Fe(II), Co(II), Ni(II). Many variations of pyridine N-oxide are known, such as the dioxides of 2,2'- and 4,4'-2,2'-bipyridine. Complexes derived from the trioxide of terpyridine have been crystallized as well.

Pyridine-N-oxides bind to metals through the oxygen. According to X-ray crystallography, the M-O-N angle is approximately 130° in many of these complexes. As reflected by the pKa of 0.79 for C_{5}H_{5}NOH^{+}, pyridine N-oxides are weakly basic ligands. Their complexes are generally high spin, hence they are kinetically labile.

== Amine oxides ==
Oxides of tertiary amines, which are more basic than pyridine-N-oxides, form a variety of metal complexes. One such complex is derived from N-methylmorpholine-N-oxide and osmium tetroxide. This adduct is a probable intermediate in the Upjohn dihydroxylation.

== Applications ==
Structure of zinc pyrithione, a popular antidandruff medicine.

Zinc pyrithione is a coordination complex of a sulfur-substituted pyridine-N-oxide. This zinc complex has useful fungistatic and bacteriostatic properties.
