= Victor Villiger =

Chemist (1868–1934)

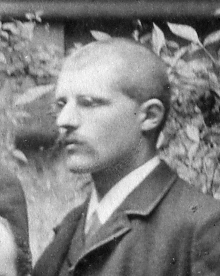
- Victor Villiger
- Born: 1 September 1868; Cham, Switzerland
- Died: 10 June 1934 (aged 65); Ludwigshafen, Germany
- Education: University of Geneva, Ludwig-Maximilians-Universität München
- Known for: Baeyer-Villiger oxidation
- Scientific career
- Workplaces: Ludwig-Maximilians-Universität München, BASF
- Doctoral advisor: Adolf von Baeyer

Victor Villiger (1 September 1868 – 10 June 1934) was a Swiss-born German chemist and the discoverer of the Baeyer-Villiger oxidation.

== Life ==
Villiger studied at the University of Geneva. Following his graduation, he began his doctoral studies with Adolf von Baeyer at the Ludwig-Maximilians-Universität München.

He started working at BASF in Ludwigshafen in 1905.
