= Peroxybenzoic acid =

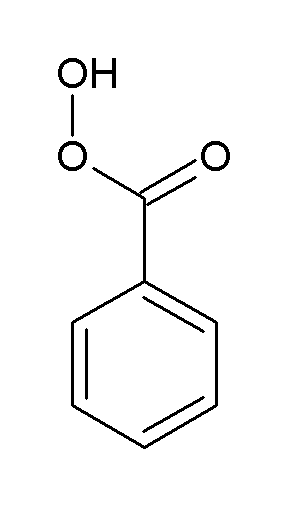
Skeletal formula
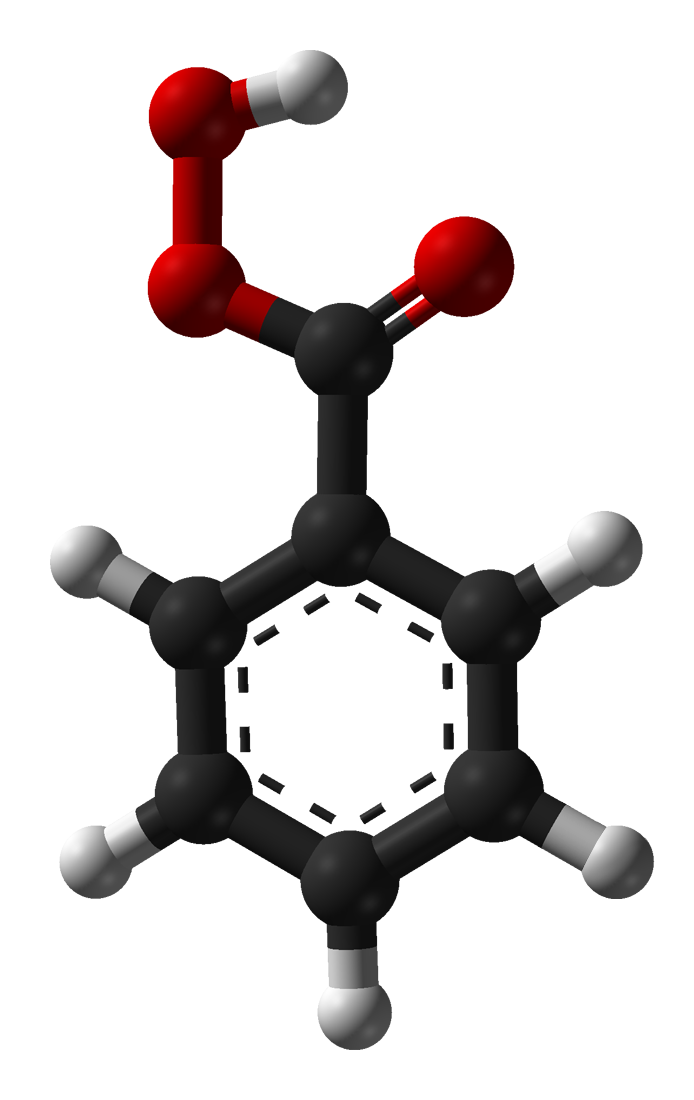
Ball-and-stick model

Names
- Preferred IUPAC name Benzenecarboperoxoic acid
- Systematic IUPAC name Oxobenzoic acid Oxidobenzoic acid
- Other names Peroxybenzoic acid Perbenzoic acid Benzoperoxoic acid Hydroxy benzoate Benzoyl hydroperoxide

Identifiers
CAS Number	93-59-4
3D model (JSmol)	Interactive image
ChemSpider	456283
ECHA InfoCard	100.002.056
EC Number	202-260-2
MeSH	C017611
PubChem CID	523077
UNII	C0EZ97V99I
CompTox Dashboard (EPA)	DTXSID10239223
- InChI: InChI=1S/C7H6O3/c8-7(10-9)6-4-2-1-3-5-6/h1-5,9H Key: XCRBXWCUXJNEFX-UHFFFAOYSA-N; InChI=1/C7H6O3/c8-7(10-9)6-4-2-1-3-5-6/h1-5,9H Key: XCRBXWCUXJNEFX-UHFFFAOYAA
- SMILES: OOC(=O)c1ccccc1

Properties
Chemical formula	C_{7}H_{6}O_{3}
Molar mass	138.12 g/mol
Melting point	41 to 42 °C (106 to 108 °F; 314 to 315 K)
Acidity (pK_{a})	7.8

Related compounds
Related compounds	m-Chloroperoxybenzoic acid Hydrogen peroxide Benzoic acid
- Except where otherwise noted, data are given for materials in their standard state (at 25 °C [77 °F], 100 kPa). verify (what is ?) Infobox references

Peroxybenzoic acid is an organic compound with the formula C_{6}H_{5}CO_{3}H. It is the simplest aryl peroxy acid. It may be synthesized from benzoic acid and hydrogen peroxide, or by the treatment of benzoyl peroxide with sodium methoxide, followed by acidification.

Like other peroxyacids, it may be used to generate epoxides, such as styrene oxide from styrene:
