= 2,3,6-Trimethylphenol =

Names
- Preferred IUPAC name 2,3,6-Trimethylphenol

Identifiers
CAS Number	2416-94-6
3D model (JSmol)	Interactive image
ChEMBL	ChEMBL3182738
ChemSpider	16119
ECHA InfoCard	100.017.574
EC Number	219-330-3
PubChem CID	17016
UNII	05WKL2L5LJ
CompTox Dashboard (EPA)	DTXSID6022187
- InChI: InChI=1S/C9H12O/c1-6-4-5-7(2)9(10)8(6)3/h4-5,10H,1-3H3 Key: QQOMQLYQAXGHSU-UHFFFAOYSA-N
- SMILES: CC1=C(C(=C(C=C1)C)O)C

Properties
Chemical formula	C_{9}H_{12}O
Molar mass	136.194 g·mol^{−1}
Appearance	white solid
Melting point	72 °C (162 °F; 345 K)

Hazards
- GHS labelling
Pictograms	(GHS05: Corrosive) (GHS07: Exclamation mark)
Signal word	Danger
Hazard statements	H315, H318
Precautionary statements	P260, P264, P271, P272, P280, P301+P330+P331, P302+P352, P303+P361+P353, P304+P340, P305+P351+P338, P310, P312, P321, P332+P313, P333+P313, P362, P363, P403+P233, P405, P501
- Except where otherwise noted, data are given for materials in their standard state (at 25 °C [77 °F], 100 kPa). Infobox references

2,3,6-Trimethylphenol is an organic compound with the formula (CH_{3})_{3}C_{6}H_{2}OH. As a precursor to vitamin E, it is the most widely used of the several isomers of trimethylphenol.

2,3,6-Trimethylphenol is produced industrially by the methylation of m-cresol with methanol in the presence of a solid acid.
