= Jakob Meisenheimer =

German chemist (1876–1934)

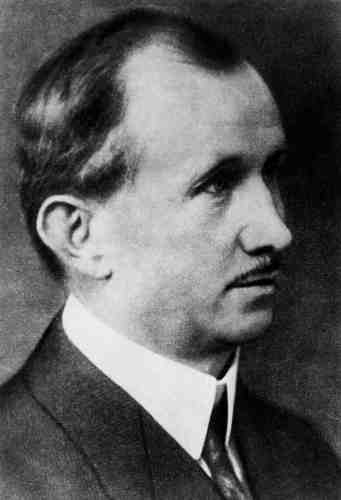
- Jakob Meisenheimer
- Born: 14 June 1876; Griesheim (Frankfurt am Main), German Empire
- Died: 2 December 1934 (aged 58); Tübingen, Germany
- Education: Ludwig-Maximilians-Universität München
- Known for: Meisenheimer complex, Mechanism of the Beckmann rearrangement
- Scientific career
- Workplaces: Ludwig-Maximilians-Universität München, University of Greifswald, University of Tübingen
- Doctoral advisor: Friedrich Karl Johannes Thiele

Jakob Meisenheimer (14 June 1876 – 2 December 1934) was a German chemist. He made numerous contributions to organic chemistry, the most famous being his proposed structure for a group of compounds now named Meisenheimer complex. He also proposed the mechanism of the Beckmann rearrangement. Later in his career, he reported the synthesis of the pyridine-N-oxide.
