= Peroxydiphosphoric acid =

Names
- Other names peroxodiphosphoric acid

Identifiers
CAS Number	potassium salt: 15593-49-4
3D model (JSmol)	Interactive image
ChEBI	CHEBI:29284
ChemSpider	103142
PubChem CID	115278
CompTox Dashboard (EPA)	DTXSID701337409
- InChI: InChI=1S/H4O8P2/c1-9(2,3)7-8-10(4,5)6/h(H2,1,2,3)(H2,4,5,6) Key: NUGJFLYPGQISPX-UHFFFAOYSA-N; InChI=1S/H4O8P2/c1-9(2,3)7-8-10(4,5)6/h(H2,1,2,3)(H2,4,5,6)
- SMILES: OP(=O)(O)OOP(=O)(O)O

Properties
Chemical formula	H_{4}P_{2}O_{8}
Molar mass	193.97 g/mol

Related compounds
Related compounds	peroxymonophosphoric acid
- Except where otherwise noted, data are given for materials in their standard state (at 25 °C [77 °F], 100 kPa). Infobox references

Peroxydiphosphoric acid ((HO_{2}P(O)O−OP(O)(OH)_{2}) is an oxyacid of phosphorus. Its salts are known as peroxydiphosphates. It is closely related to peroxymonophosphoric acid. These compounds (and their salts) are in turn related to the peroxydisulfuric acid and peroxysulfuric acid. These compounds are all colorless. In terms of structure, peroxydiphosphoric acid features two tetrahedral phosphorus centers linked by a peroxide group.

== Preparation ==
Both peroxyphosphoric acids were first synthesized and characterized in 1910 by Julius Schmidlin and Paul Massini, where peroxydiphosphoric acid was obtained in poor yields from the reaction between diphosphoric acid and highly concentrated hydrogen peroxide.

H_{4}P_{2}O_{7} + H_{2}O_{2} → H_{4}P_{2}O_{8} + H_{2}O

Peroxydiphosphoric acid can be prepared by the reaction between phosphoric acid and fluorine, with peroxymonophosphoric acid being a by-product.

2 H_{3}PO_{4} + F_{2} → H_{4}P_{2}O_{8} + 2 HF

The compound is not commercially available and must be prepared as needed. Potassium peroxodiphosphate, which is commercially available, can be obtained by electrolysis of phosphate solutions.

== Properties ==
Peroxydiphosphoric acid is a tetraprotic acid, with acid dissociation constants given by pK_{a1} ≈ −0.3, pK_{a2} ≈ 0.5, pK_{a3} = 5.2 and pK_{a4} = 7.6. In aqueous solution, it disproportionates upon heating to peroxymonophosphoric acid and phosphoric acid.

H_{4}P_{2}O_{8} + H_{2}O ⇌ H_{3}PO_{5} + H_{3}PO_{4}
