= Mesitol =

Names
- Preferred IUPAC name 2,4,6-Trimethylphenol
- Other names Hydroxymesitylene; Mesityl alcohol

Identifiers
| CAS Number | 527-60-6 |
| 3D model (JSmol) | Interactive image |
| ChemSpider | 10248 |
| ECHA InfoCard | 100.007.655 |
| EC Number | 208-419-2 |
| PubChem CID | 10698 |
| UNII | FPZ32614N6 |
| CompTox Dashboard (EPA) | DTXSID7022049 |
- InChI: InChI=1S/C9H12O/c1-6-4-7(2)9(10)8(3)5-6/h4-5,10H,1-3H3 Key: BPRYUXCVCCNUFE-UHFFFAOYSA-N
- SMILES: Cc1cc(c(c(c1)C)O)C

Properties
| Chemical formula | C_{9}H_{12}O |
| Molar mass | 136.194 g·mol^{−1} |
| Appearance | white solid |
| Melting point | 70–72 °C (158–162 °F; 343–345 K) |
| Boiling point | 220 °C (428 °F; 493 K) |
| Solubility in water | 1.01 g/l |

Hazards
- GHS labelling
| Pictograms | (GHS05: Corrosive) (GHS09: Environmental hazard) |
| Signal word | Danger |
| Hazard statements | H314, H411 |
| Precautionary statements | P260, P264, P273, P280, P301+P330+P331, P303+P361+P353, P304+P340, P305+P351+P338, P310, P321, P363, P391, P405, P501 |
- Except where otherwise noted, data are given for materials in their standard state (at 25 °C [77 °F], 100 kPa). Infobox references

Mesitol (2,4,6-trimethylphenol) is an organic compound with the formula (CH_{3})_{3}C_{6}H_{2}OH. It is one of several isomers of trimethylphenol. The name and structure of mesitol derives from the combination of mesitylene and phenol.

== Synthesis ==
Mesitol is the main product from the methylation of phenol with methanol in the presence of a solid acid.

It can also be obtained by reaction of mesitylene with peroxymonophosphoric acid:

An alternative route involves palladium-catalyzed reaction of bromomesitylene with potassium hydroxide.
