= Meta-Chloroperoxybenzoic acid =

meta-Chloroperoxybenzoic acid

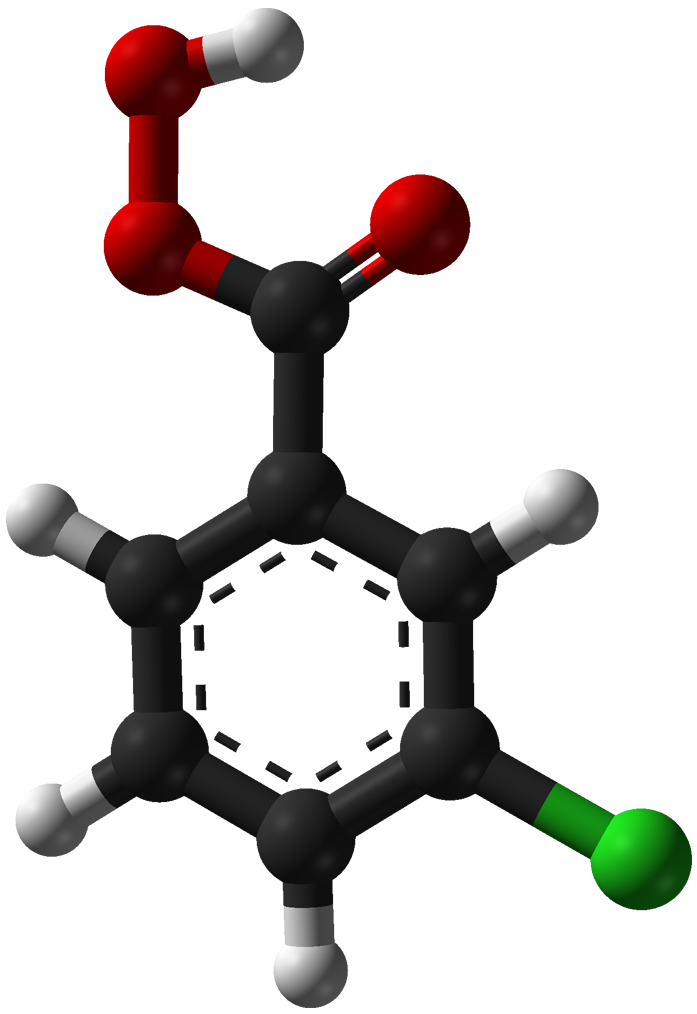

Names
- Preferred IUPAC name 3-Chlorobenzene-1-carboperoxoic acid
- Other names: 3-Chloroperoxybenzoic acid; 3-Chloroperbenzoic acid; 3-Chlorobenzoperoxoic acid; meta-Chloroperoxybenzoic acid; m-Chloroperoxybenzoic acid; meta-Chloroperbenzoic acid; mCPBA; m-CPBA

Identifiers
CAS Number	937-14-4
3D model (JSmol)	Interactive image
ChemSpider	63480
ECHA InfoCard	100.012.111
EC Number	213-322-3
PubChem CID	70297
RTECS number	SD9470000
UNII	G203D4H1RB
UN number	3106
CompTox Dashboard (EPA)	DTXSID0061325
- InChI: InChI=1S/C7H5ClO3/c8-6-3-1-2-5(4-6)7(9)11-10/h1-4,10H Key: NHQDETIJWKXCTC-UHFFFAOYSA-N; InChI=1S/C7H5ClO3/c8-6-3-1-2-5(4-6)7(9)11-10/h1-4,10H Key: FQAWBGAIOYWONH-UHFFFAOYAN
- SMILES: ClC1=CC(C(OO)=O)=CC=C1

Properties
Chemical formula	C_{7}H_{5}ClO_{3}
Molar mass	172.56 g·mol^{−1}
Appearance	White powder
Acidity (pK_{a})	7.57

Hazards
- Occupational safety and health (OHS/OSH)
Main hazards	Oxidizing, corrosive, explosive
- GHS labelling
Pictograms	(GHS02: Flammable) (GHS05: Corrosive) (GHS07: Exclamation mark)
Signal word	Danger
Hazard statements	H226, H314, H335
Precautionary statements	P210, P220, P233, P234, P240, P241, P242, P243, P260, P264, P271, P272, P280, P301+P330+P331, P302+P352, P303+P361+P353, P304+P340, P305+P351+P338, P310, P312, P321, P332+P313, P333+P313, P337+P313, P362, P363, P370+P378, P403+P233, P403+P235, P405, P411, P420, P501

Related compounds
Related compounds	peroxyacetic acid; peroxybenzoic acid
- Except where otherwise noted, data are given for materials in their standard state (at 25 °C [77 °F], 100 kPa). verify (what is ?) Infobox references

meta-Chloroperoxybenzoic acid (mCPBA or mCPBA) is a peroxycarboxylic acid. It is a white solid often used widely as an oxidant in organic synthesis. mCPBA is often preferred to other peroxy acids because of its relative ease of handling. mCPBA is a strong oxidizing agent that may cause fire upon contact with flammable material.

== Preparation and purification ==
mCPBA can be prepared by reacting m-chlorobenzoyl chloride with a basic solution of hydrogen peroxide, followed by acidification.

It is sold commercially as a shelf-stable mixture that is less than 72% mCPBA, with the balance made up of m-chlorobenzoic acid (10%) and water. The peroxyacid can be purified by washing the commercial material with a sodium hydroxide and potassium phosphate solution buffered at pH = 7.5. Peroxyacids are generally slightly less acidic than their carboxylic acid counterparts, so the acid impurity can be extracted if the pH is carefully controlled. The purified material is reasonably stable against decomposition if stored at low temperatures in a plastic container.

In reactions where the exact amount of mCPBA must be controlled, a sample can be titrated to determine the exact amount of active oxidant.

== Reactions ==
The main areas of use are the conversion of ketones to esters (Baeyer-Villiger oxidation), epoxidation of alkenes (Prilezhaev reaction), conversion of silyl enol ethers to silyl α-hydroxy ketones (Rubottom oxidation), oxidation of sulfides to sulfoxides and sulfones, and oxidation of amines to produce amine oxides. The following scheme shows the epoxidation of cyclohexene with mCPBA.

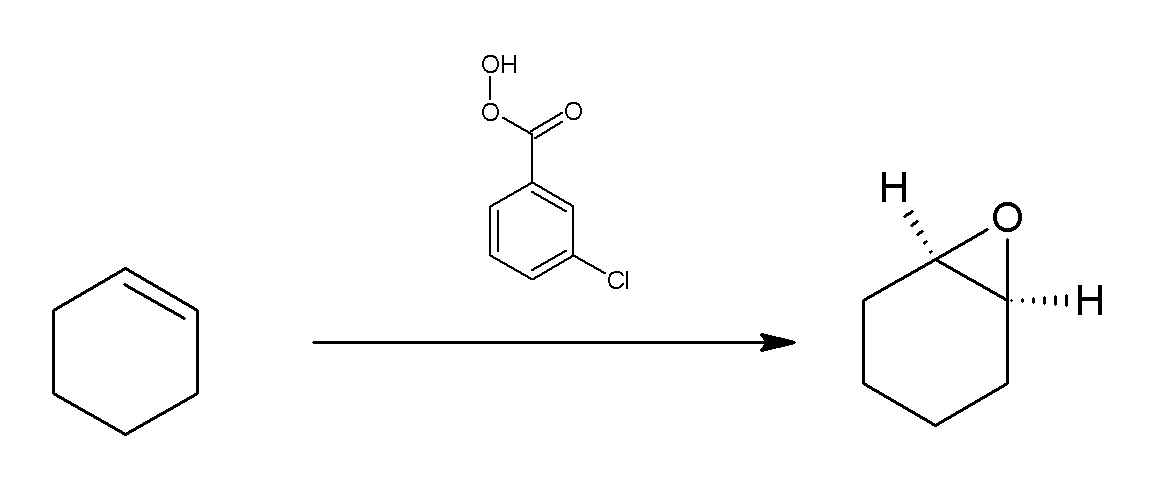

The epoxidation mechanism is concerted: the cis or trans geometry of the alkene starting material is retained in the epoxide ring of the product. The transition state of the Prilezhaev reaction is given below:

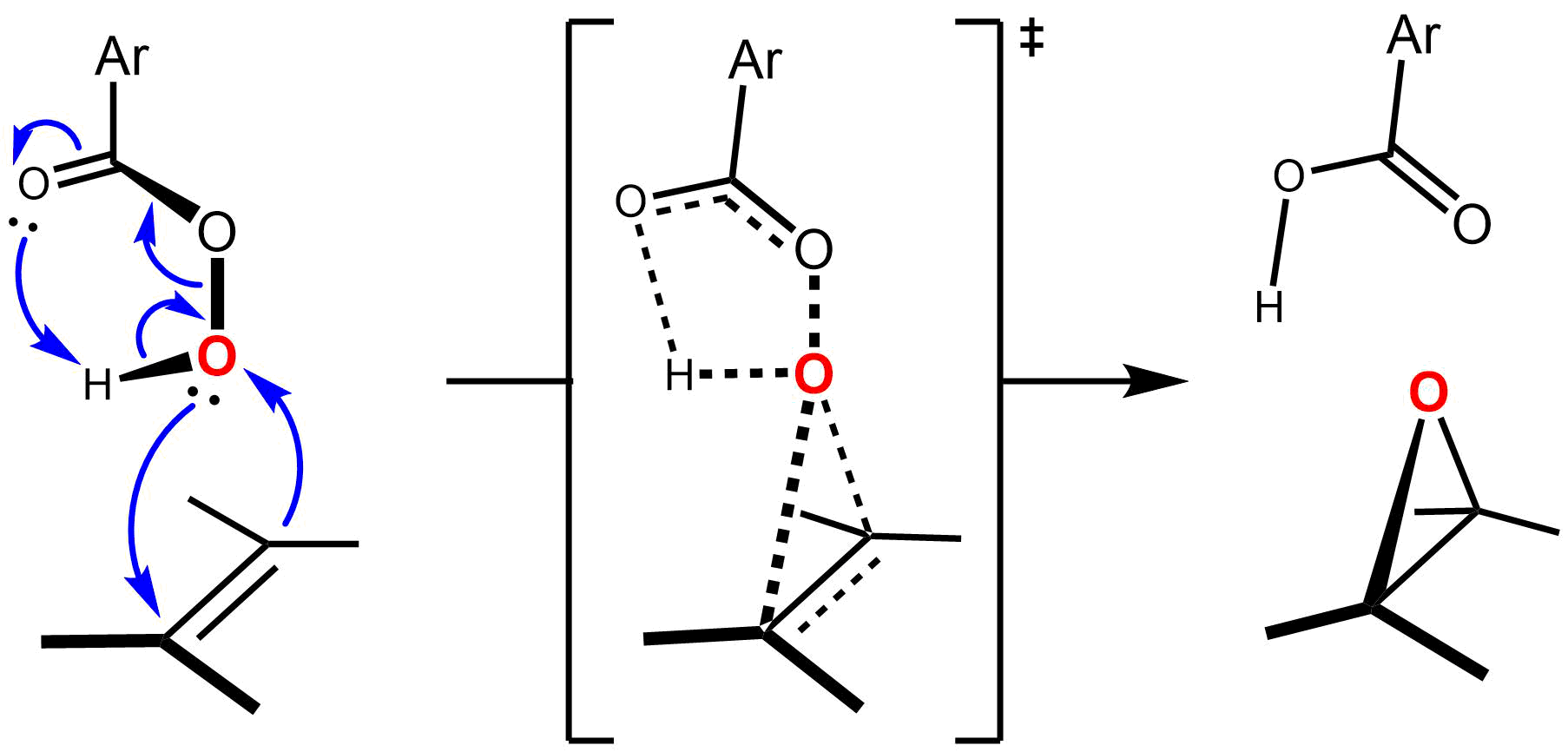

The geometry of the transition state, with the peracid bisecting the C-C double bond, allows the two primary frontier orbital interactions to occur: π_{C=C} (HOMO) to σ*_{O-O} (LUMO) and n_{O} (HOMO, regarded as a filled p orbital on a sp^{2} hybridized oxygen) to π*_{C=C} (LUMO), corresponding, in arrow-pushing terms, to formation of one C-O bond and cleavage of the O-O bond and formation of the other C-O bond and cleavage of the C=C π bond.
