= Amine oxide =

Chemical compound containing the functional group R3NO

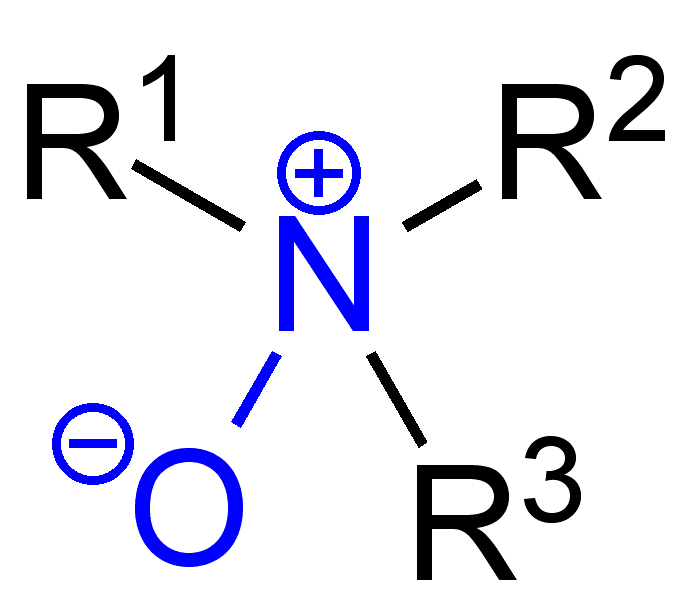
General structure of an amine oxide

In chemistry, an amine oxide, also known as an amine N-oxide or simply N-oxide, is a chemical compound that has the chemical formula R_{3}N^{+}−O^{−}. It contains a nitrogen-oxygen coordinate covalent bond with three additional hydrogen and/or substituent-groups attached to nitrogen. Sometimes it is written as R_{3}N→O or, alternatively, as R_{3}N=O.

In the strict sense, the term amine oxide applies only to oxides of tertiary amines. Sometimes it is also used for the analogous derivatives of primary and secondary amines.

Commonly, amine oxides are white, water-soluble solids:

- Trimethylamine-N-oxide, (m.p. 220 °C), an osmolyte found in molluscs
- Pyridine-N-oxide, (m.p. 62–67 °C)
- N-Methylmorpholine N-oxide, (m.p. 184–187 °C), a nucleophilic oxidant

== Applications ==
Imipraminoxide (Imiprex) is used for the treatment of depression.

Long-chain alkyl amine oxides are used as amphoteric surfactants and foam stabilizers.

Amine oxides are surfactants commonly used in consumer products such as shampoos, conditioners, detergents, and hard surface cleaners. Alkyl dimethyl amine oxide (chain lengths C10–C16) is the most commercially used amine oxide. They are considered a high production volume class of compounds in more than one member country of the Organisation for Economic Co-operation and Development (OECD); with annual production over 26,000, 16,000 and 6,800 tonnes (28,700, 17,600 and 7,500 short tons) in the US, Europe, and Japan, respectively. In North America, more than 95% of amine oxides are used in home cleaning products. They serve as stabilizers, thickeners, emollients, emulsifiers, and conditioners with active concentrations in the range of 0.1–10%. The remainder (< 5%) is used in personal care, institutional, commercial products and for unique patented uses such as photography.

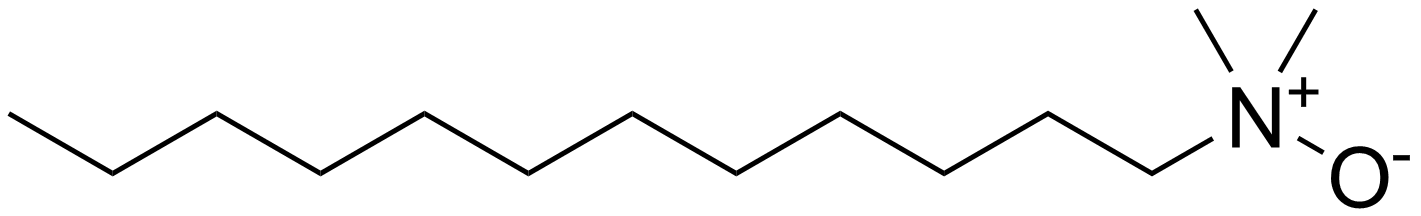
Lauryldimethylamine oxide, a fatty amine derivative, is a germicidal ingredient in many cosmetics.

== Properties ==
Amine oxides are highly polar molecules and have a polarity close to that of quaternary ammonium salts. Small amine oxides are very hydrophilic; they have excellent solubility in water and very poor solubility in most nonpolar solvents.

Amine oxides are moderate bases. Aliphatic amine oxides all have pK_{a}s roughly 4-5, independent of the original amine. Heteroaromatic N-oxides delocalize the oxygen lone pairs into the ring and are much less basic; their pK_{a}s are around 1.

== Synthesis ==
Almost all amine oxides are prepared by the oxidation of either tertiary aliphatic amines or aromatic N-heterocycles. Acidified hydrogen peroxide is the most common reagent both industrially and in academia. Peracids are also important and see niche use, for instance Caro's acid or mCPBA. These reactions generally oxidize the more basic nitrogen in polyamines first, and can disturb a number of other functional groups. Other reactions producing amine oxides, such as the retro-Cope elimination, are rarely employed.

Spontaneous or catalysed reactions using molecular oxygen are rare. Nevertheless, they are a component of the aerobic degradation of amine-based reagents. Amines left exposed to air slowly react with oxygen to form N-oxides. This process can cause the amines to turn a yellowish color and the N-oxides can decompose further into byproducts. Oxidation due to air can be prevented by storing reagents under inert atmosphere.

== Reactions ==
Amine oxides exhibit many kinds of reactions.

- Pyrolytic elimination. Amine oxides, when heated to 150–200 °C undergo a Cope reaction to form a hydroxylamine and an alkene. The reaction requires the alkyl groups to have hydrogens at the beta-carbon (i.e. works with ethyl and above, but not methyl)
- Reduction to amines. Amine oxides are readily converted to the parent amine by common reductants including: sulfide reagents, sulfur dioxide, phosphorus trichloride, or nitric oxide; iron or zinc powder in acetic acid or alkali; catalytic hydrogenation with Raney nickel; or acidic hydride salts (e.g. a combination of sodium borohydride and aluminum trichloride). In very rare cases, simply standing in acid suffices.
- Sacrificial catalysis. Oxidants can be regenerated by reduction of N-oxides, as in the case of regeneration of osmium tetroxide by N-methylmorpholine N-oxide in the Upjohn dihydroxylation.
- O-Alkylation. Pyridine N-oxides react with alkyl halides to the O-alkylated product
- Lewis bases and ligands
- In the Meisenheimer rearrangement, certain N-oxides R^{1}R^{2}R^{3}N^{+}−O^{−} rearrange to alkoxylamines R^{2}R^{3}N−O−R^{1}
- In the Polonovski reaction, a tertiary N-oxide is cleaved by acetic acid anhydride to the corresponding acetamide and aldehyde:

== Metabolites ==
Amine oxides are common metabolites of medication and psychoactive drugs. Examples include nicotine, zolmitriptan, and morphine.

Amine oxides of anti-cancer drugs have been developed as prodrugs that are metabolized in the oxygen-deficient cancer tissue to the active drug.

== Human safety ==
Amine oxides are not known to be carcinogens, dermal sensitizers, or reproductive toxicants. They are readily metabolized and excreted if ingested. Chronic ingestion by rabbits found lower body weight, diarrhea, and lenticular opacities at lowest observed adverse effect levels (LOAEL) in the range of 87–150 mg AO/kg bw/day. Tests of human skin exposure have found that after 8 hours less than 1% is absorbed into the body. Eye irritation due to amine oxides and other surfactants is moderate and temporary with no lasting effects.

== Environmental safety ==
Amine oxides with an average chain length of 12.6 have been measured to be water-soluble at ~410 g/L. They are considered to have low bioaccumulation potential in aquatic species based on log K_{ow} data from chain lengths less than C14 (bioconcentration factor < 87%). Levels of amine oxides in untreated influent were found to be 2.3–27.8 μg/L, while in effluent they were found to be 0.4–2.91 μg/L. The highest effluent concentrations were found in oxidation ditch and trickling filter treatment plants. On average, over 96% removal has been found with secondary activated sludge treatment. Acute toxicity in fish, as indicated by 96 h LC_{50} tests, is in the range of 1,000–3,000 μg/L for carbon chain lengths less than C14. LC50 values for chain lengths greater than C14 range from 600 to 1400 μg/L. Chronic toxicity data for fish is 420 μg/L. When normalized to C12.9, the NOEC is 310 μg/L for growth and hatchability.

== See also ==
- Functional group
- Amine, NR_{3}
- Hydroxylamine, NR_{2}OH
- Phosphine oxide, PR_{3}=O
- Sulfoxide, R_{2}S=O
- Azoxy, RN=N^{+}(O^{−})R RN=N^{+}RO^{−}
- Aminoxyl group, radicals with the general structure R_{2}N–O•
- Category:Amine oxides, containing all articles on specific amine-oxide compounds
