= Prilezhaev reaction =

Chemical reaction

Named after	Nikolai Alexandrovich Prilezhaev (also spelled Nikolaj Alexandrovich Prileschajew, Russian: Николай Александрович Прилежаев)
Reaction type	Ring forming reaction

Identifiers
Organic Chemistry Portal	prilezhaev-reaction
RSC ontology ID	RXNO:0000405

The Prilezhaev reaction, also known as the Prileschajew reaction or Prilezhaev epoxidation, is the chemical reaction of an alkene with a peroxy acid to form epoxides. It is named after Nikolai Prilezhaev, who first reported this reaction in 1909. A widely used peroxy acid for this reaction is meta-chloroperoxybenzoic acid (m-CPBA), due to good stability and solubility in most organic solvents. The reaction is performed in inert solvents (C_{6}H_{14}, C_{6}H_{6}, CH_{2}Cl_{2}, CHCl_{3}, CCl_{4}) between −10 and 60 °C with the yield of 60–80%.

An illustrative example is the epoxidation of trans-2-butene with m-CPBA to give trans-2,3-epoxybutane:

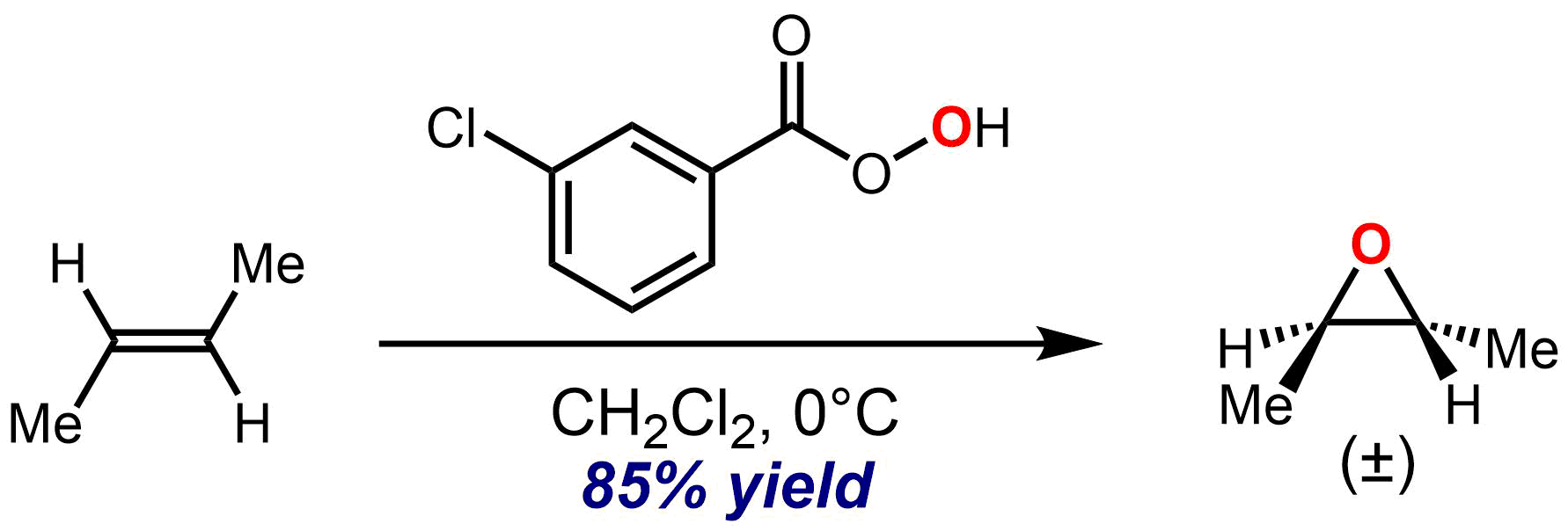

The oxygen atom that adds across the double bond of the alkene is taken from the peroxy acid, generating a molecule of the corresponding carboxylic acid as a byproduct. The reaction is highly stereospecific in the sense that the double bond stereochemistry is generally transferred to the relative configuration of the epoxide with essentially perfect fidelity, so that a trans-olefin leads to the stereoselective formation of the trans-2,3-substituted epoxide only, as illustrated by the example above, while a cis-olefin would only give the cis-epoxide. This stereochemical outcome is a consequence of the accepted mechanism, discussed below.

In general, the Prilezhaev reaction epoxidizes the most substituted double bond.

== Reaction mechanism ==
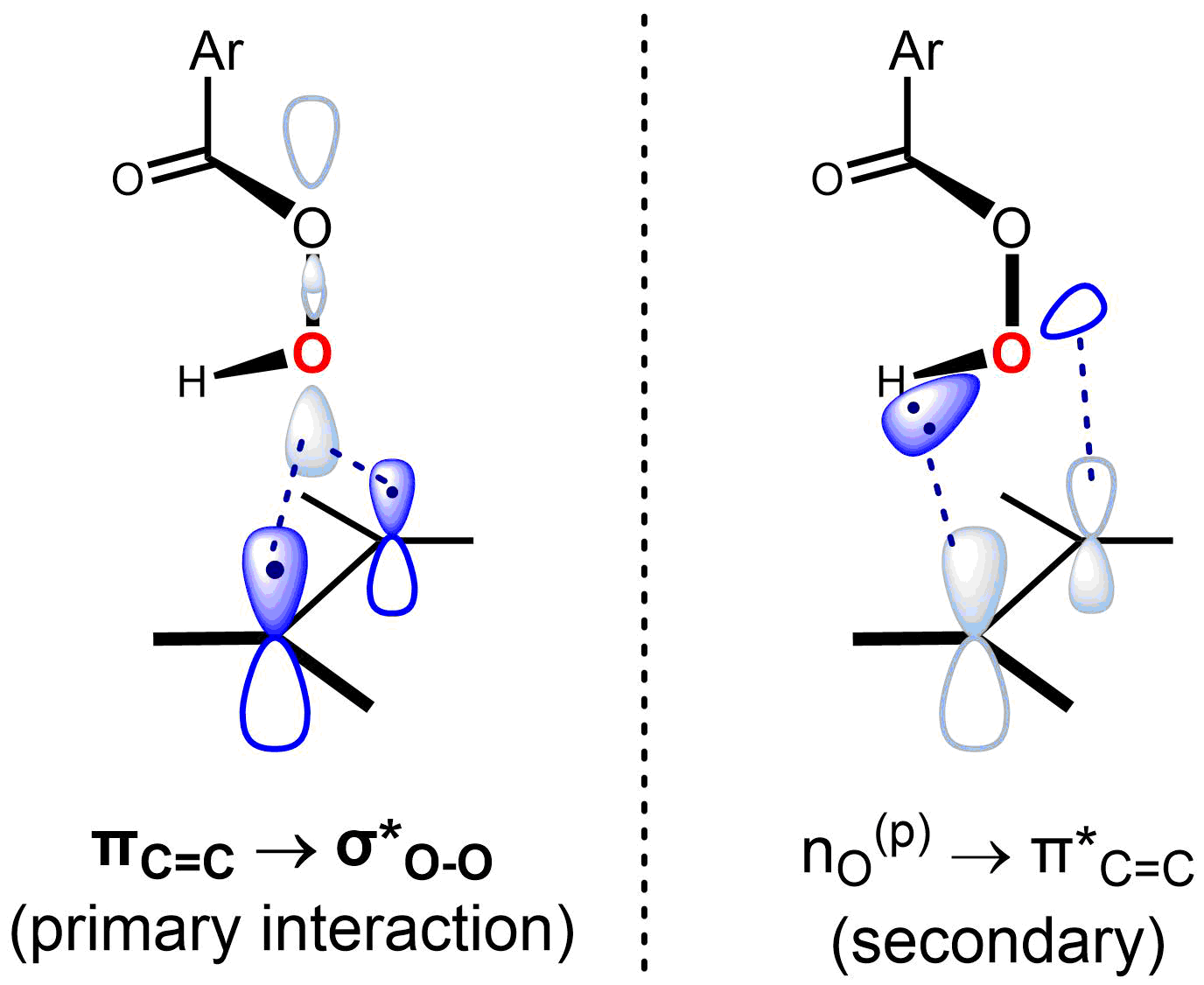
The frontier orbital interactions involved in the Prilezhaev reaction

The reaction proceeds through what is commonly known as the "butterfly mechanism", first proposed by Bartlett, wherein the peracid is intramolecularly hydrogen-bonded at the transition state. Although there are frontier orbital interactions in both directions, the peracid is generally viewed as the electrophile and the alkene as the nucleophile. In support of this notion, more electron-rich alkenes undergo epoxidation at a faster rate. For example, the relative rates of epoxidation increase upon methyl substitution of the alkene (the methyl groups increase the electron density of the double bond by hyperconjugation): ethylene (1, no methyl groups), propene (24, one methyl group), cis-2-butene (500, two methyl groups), 2-methyl-2-butene (6500, three methyl groups), 2,3-dimethyl-2-butene (>6500, four methyl groups).

The reaction is believed to be concerted, with a transition state that is synchronous or nearly so. The "butterfly mechanism" takes place via a transition state geometry in which the plane of the peracid bisects that of the alkene, with the O–O bond aligned perpendicular to it. This conformation allows the key frontier orbital interactions to occur. The primary interaction of the occupied π_{C=C} orbital (HOMO) and the low-lying unoccupied σ*_{O-O} orbital (LUMO). This interaction accounts for the observed overall nucleophilic character and electrophilic character of the alkene and peracid, respectively. There is also a secondary interaction between a lone pair orbital perpendicular to the plane of the peracid, n_{O}^{(p)} (HOMO) and the unoccupied π*_{C=C} orbital (LUMO). Using the approach of Anslyn and Dougherty (2006, p. 556), the mechanism can be represented as follows:

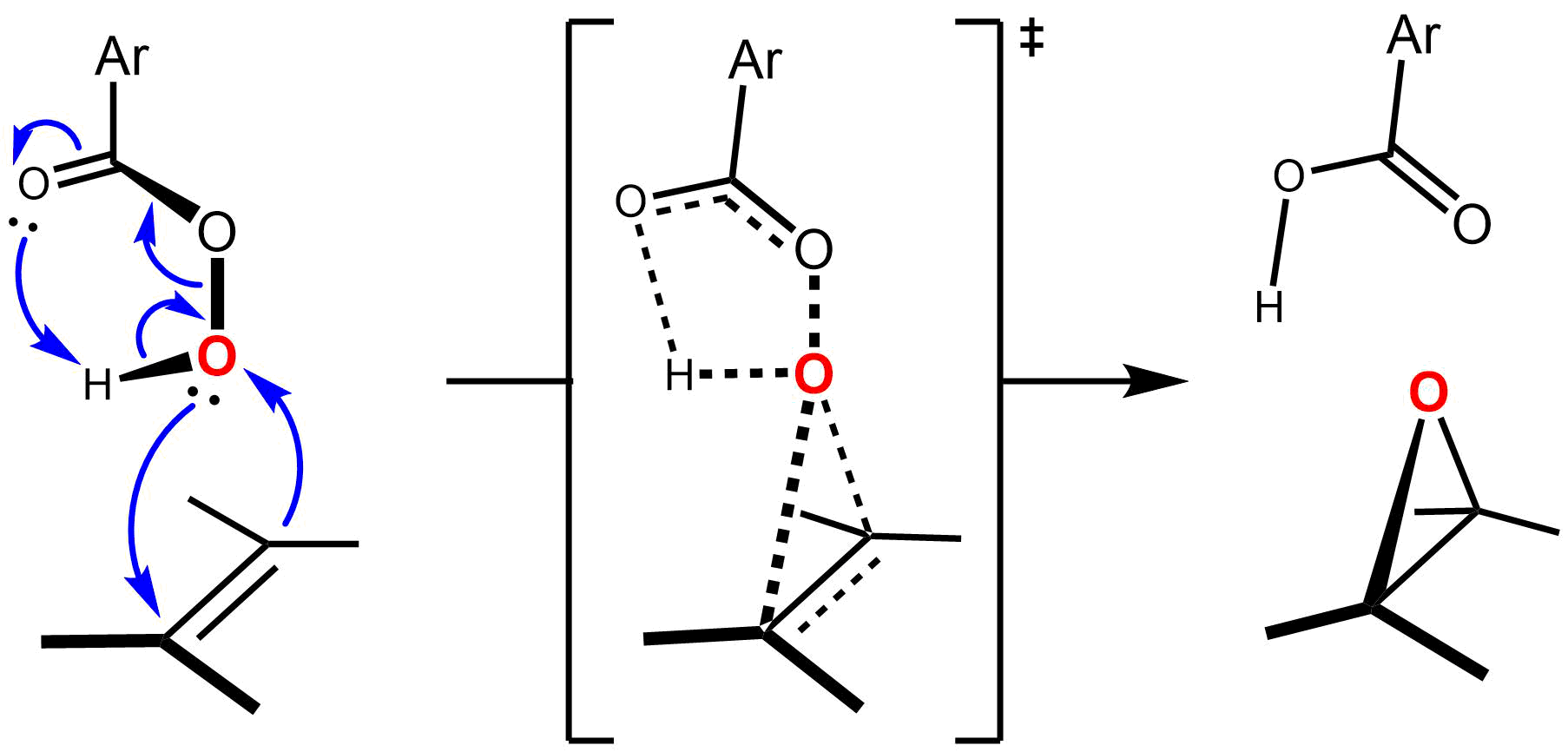

There is a very large dependence of the reaction rate on the choice of solvent.

== See also ==
- Shi epoxidation
- Sharpless epoxidation
- Jacobsen epoxidation
- Coarctate reaction
