= Baeyer–Villiger oxidation =

Organic reaction

Baeyer-Villiger oxidation
Named after	Adolf von Baeyer; Victor Villiger
Reaction type	Organic redox reaction

Reaction
Ketone
+
RCO_{3}H or mCPBA
↓
Ester or Lactone

Identifiers
Organic Chemistry Portal	baeyer-villiger-oxidation
RSC ontology ID	RXNO:0000031

The Baeyer–Villiger oxidation is an organic reaction that forms an ester from a ketone or a lactone from a cyclic ketone, using peroxyacids or peroxides as the oxidant. The reaction is named after Adolf von Baeyer and Victor Villiger, who first reported the reaction in 1899.

Baeyer-Villiger oxidation

== Reaction mechanism ==
In the first step of the reaction mechanism, the peroxyacid protonates the oxygen of the carbonyl group. This makes the carbonyl group more susceptible to be attacked by the peroxyacid. Next, the peroxyacid attacks the carbon of the carbonyl group forming what is known as the Criegee intermediate. Through a concerted mechanism, one of the substituents on the ketone group migrates to the oxygen of the peroxide group while a carboxylic acid leaves. This migration step is thought to be the rate determining step. Finally, deprotonation of the oxocarbenium ion produces the ester.

Reaction mechanism of the Baeyer-Villiger oxidation.

The products of the Baeyer–Villiger oxidation are believed to be controlled through both primary and secondary stereoelectronic effects. The primary stereoelectronic effect in the Baeyer–Villiger oxidation refers to the necessity of the oxygen-oxygen bond in the peroxide group to be antiperiplanar to the group that migrates. This orientation facilitates optimum overlap of the 𝛔 orbital of the migrating group to the 𝛔* orbital of the peroxide group. The secondary stereoelectronic effect refers to the necessity of the lone pair on the oxygen of the hydroxyl group to be antiperiplanar to the migrating group. This allows for optimum overlap of the oxygen nonbonding orbital with the 𝛔* orbital of the migrating group. This migration step is also (at least in silico) assisted by two or three peroxyacid units enabling the hydroxyl proton to shuttle to its new position.

Stereoelectronic effects

The migratory ability is ranked tertiary > secondary > aryl > primary. Allylic groups are more apt to migrate than primary alkyl groups but less so than secondary alkyl groups. Electron-withdrawing groups on the substituent decrease the rate of migration. There are two explanations for this trend in migration ability. One explanation relies on the buildup of positive charge in the transition state for breakdown of the Criegee intermediate (illustrated by the carbocation resonance structure of the Criegee intermediate). Keeping this structure in mind, it makes sense that the substituent that can maintain positive charge the best would be most likely to migrate. The higher the degree of substitution, the more stable a carbocation generally is. Therefore, the tertiary > secondary > primary trend is observed.

Resonance structures of the Criegee intermediate

Another explanation uses stereoelectronic effects and steric arguments. As mentioned, the substituent that is antiperiplanar to the peroxide group in the transition state will migrate. This transition state has a gauche interaction between the peroxyacid and the non-migrating substituent. If the bulkier group is placed antiperiplanar to the peroxide group, the gauche interaction between the substituent on the forming ester and the carbonyl group of the peroxyacid will be reduced. Thus, it is the bulkier group that will prefer to be antiperiplanar to the peroxide group, enhancing its aptitude for migration.

Steric bulk influencing migration

The migrating group in acyclic ketones, usually, is not 1° alkyl group. However, they may be persuaded to migrate in preference to the 2° or 3° groups by using CF_{3}CO_{3}H or BF_{3} + H_{2}O_{2} as reagents.

The migration does not change the stereochemistry of the group that transfers, i.e.: it is stereoretentive.

== History ==
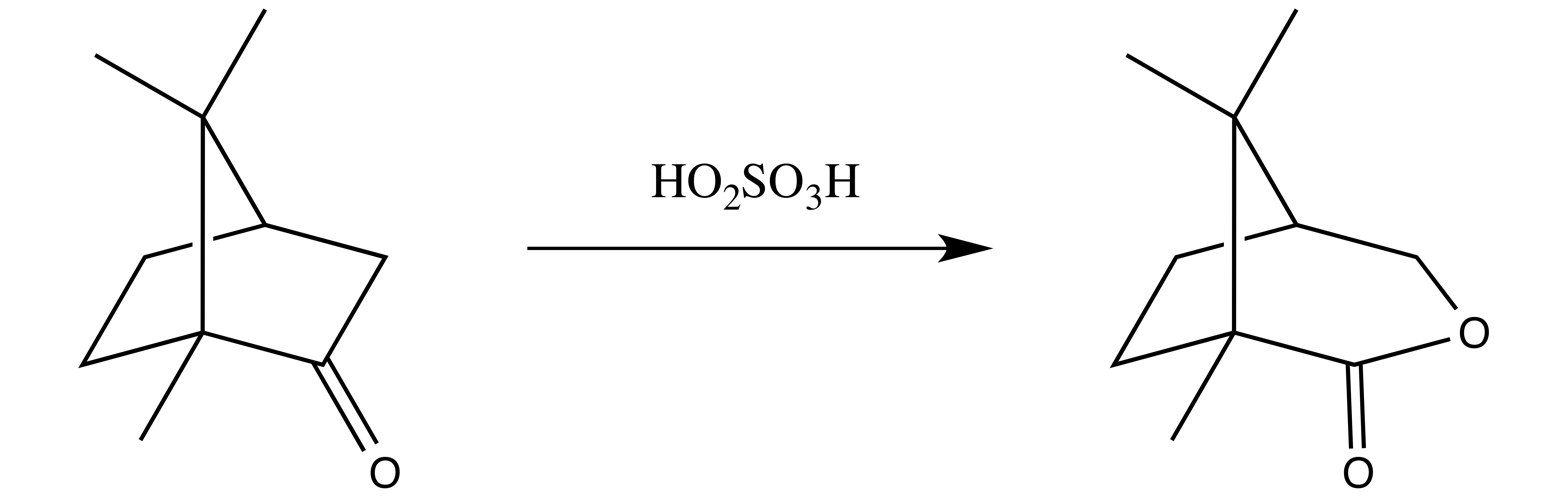
Oxidation of camphor as reported by Baeyer and Villiger.

In 1899, Adolf Baeyer and Victor Villiger demonstrated the reaction now known as the Baeyer–Villiger oxidation. They used peroxymonosulfuric acid to make the corresponding lactones from camphor, menthone, and tetrahydrocarvone.

Three reaction mechanisms were suggested. These three reaction mechanisms can really be split into two pathways of peroxyacid attack – on either the oxygen or the carbon of the carbonyl group. Attack on oxygen could lead to two possible intermediates: Baeyer and Villiger suggested a dioxirane intermediate, while Georg Wittig and Gustav Pieper suggested a peroxide with no dioxirane formation. Carbon attack was suggested by Rudolf Criegee. In this pathway, the peracid attacks the carbonyl carbon, producing what is now known as the Criegee intermediate.

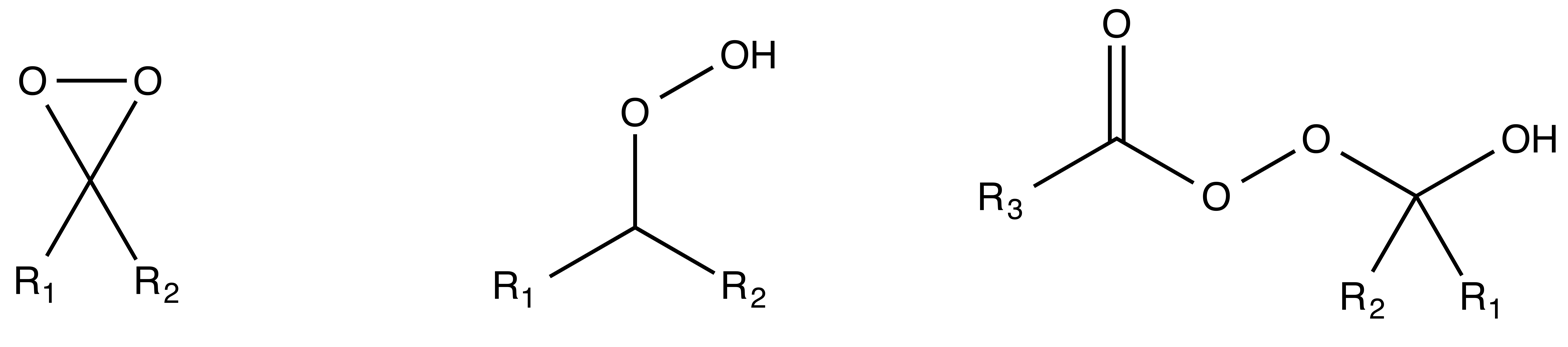
Proposed Baeyer-Villiger oxidation intermediates

In 1953, William von Eggers Doering and Edwin Dorfman identified the mechanism by using oxygen-18-labelling of benzophenone. The three previously suggested mechanisms would each lead to a different distribution of labelled products. The Criegee intermediate would lead to a product only labelled on the carbonyl oxygen. The product of the Wittig and Pieper intermediate is only labeled on the alkoxy group of the ester. The Baeyer and Villiger intermediate leads to a 1:1 distribution of both of the above products. The outcome of the labelling experiment supported the Criegee intermediate, which is now the generally accepted pathway.

The different possible outcomes of Dorfman and Doering's labelling experiment

== Reagents ==
Among the many peroxyacids used for the Baeyer–Villiger oxidation, common oxidants include meta-chloroperbenzoic acid (mCPBA) and trifluoroperacetic acid (TFPAA). The general trend is that higher reactivity is correlated with lower pK_{a} (i.e.: stronger acidity) of the corresponding carboxylic acid (or alcohol in the case of the peroxides). Therefore, the reactivity trend shows TFPAA > 4-nitroperbenzoic acid > mCPBA and performic acid > peracetic acid > hydrogen peroxide > tert-butyl hydroperoxide. Hydroperoxides are much less reactive than the peroxyacids. The use of hydrogen peroxide even requires a catalyst. In addition, using organic peroxides and hydrogen peroxide often promotes side-reactions. Oxygen can be used to convert cyclohexanol to caprolactone, but the process generates hydrogen peroxide in situ:

C_{6}H_{11}OH + O_{2} → C_{6}H_{10}O + H_{2}O_{2}
C_{6}H_{10}O + H_{2}O_{2} → C_{6}H_{10}O_{2} + H_{2}O

== Limitations ==
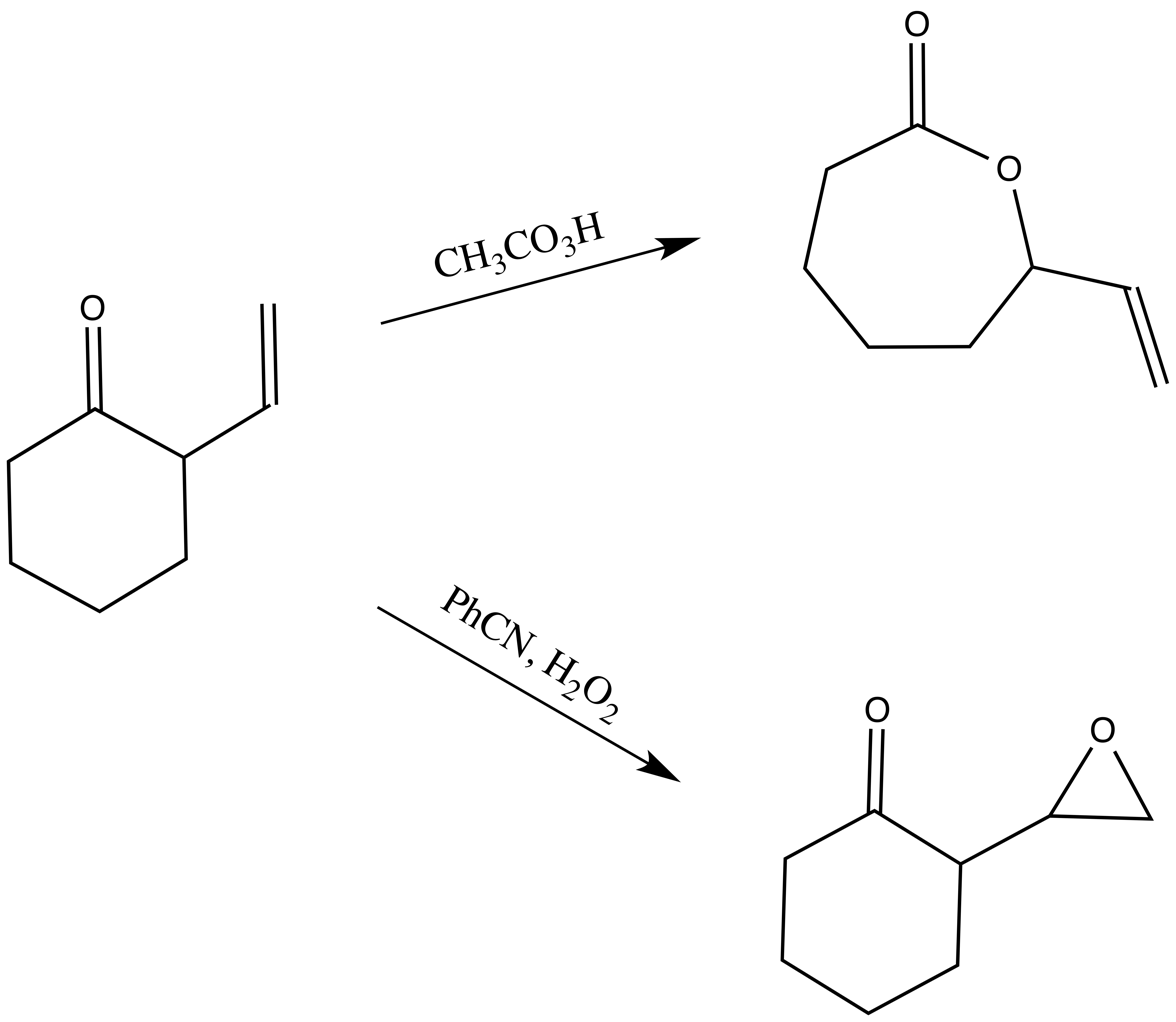
Two outcomes for peroxide oxidation

The use of peroxyacids and peroxides when performing the Baeyer–Villiger oxidation can oxidize other functional groups. For instance, electron-rich alkenes may oxidize to epoxides.

== Modifications ==
=== Catalytic Baeyer-Villiger oxidation ===
The use of hydrogen peroxide as an oxidant would make the reaction more environmentally friendly. Benzeneseleninic acid derivatives as catalysts have been reported to give high selectivity with hydrogen peroxide as the oxidant. Another promising class of catalysts are solid Lewis acid catalysts such as stannosilicates.

=== Asymmetric Baeyer-Villiger oxidation ===
There have been attempts to use organometallic catalysts to perform enantioselective Baeyer–Villiger oxidations. The first reported instance of one such oxidation of a prochiral ketone used dioxygen as the oxidant with a copper catalyst. Other catalysts, including platinum and aluminum compounds, followed.

== Baeyer-Villiger monooxygenases ==
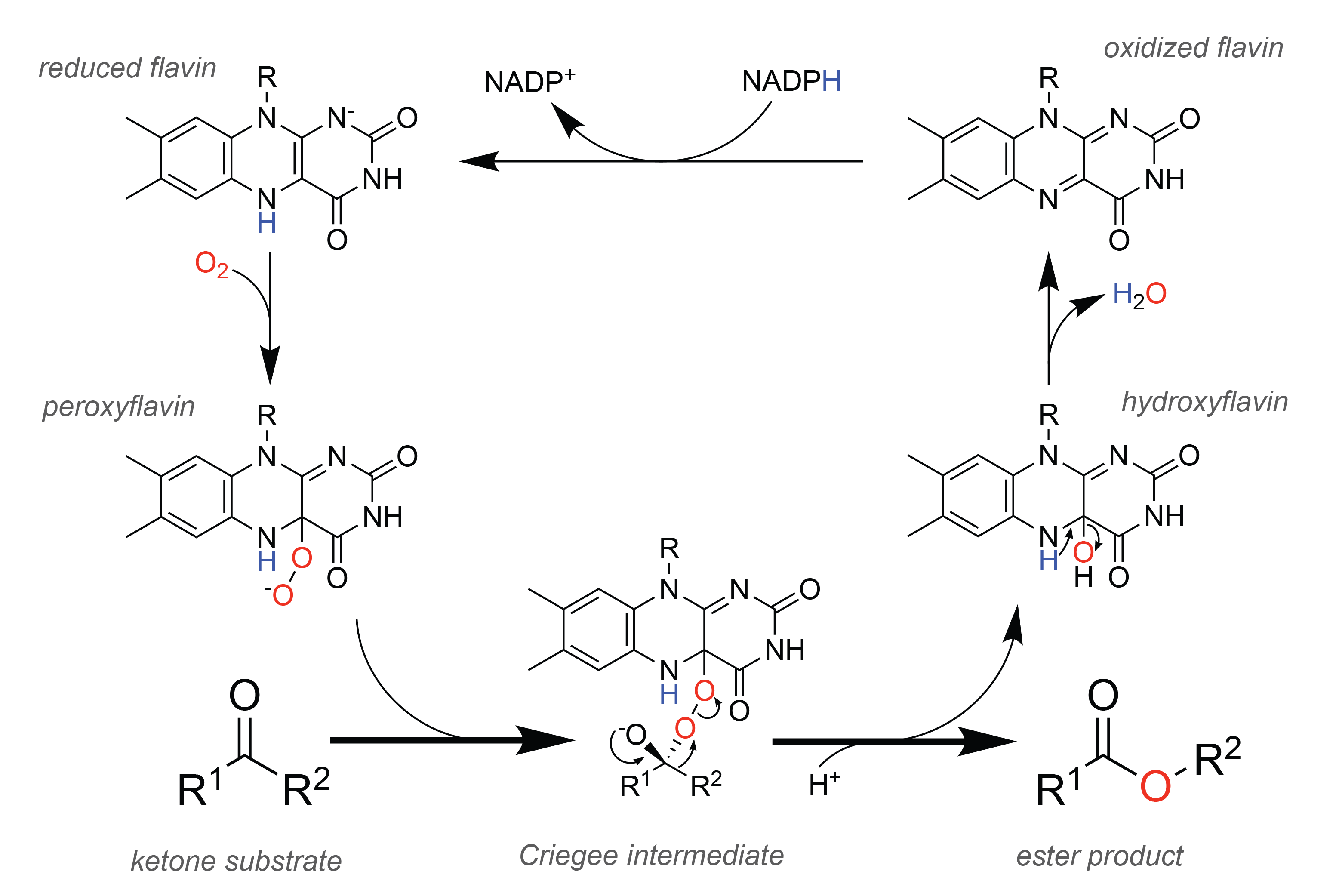
Reaction mechanism of the flavin cofactor to catalyse the Baeyer-Villiger reaction in Baeyer-Villiger monooxygenase enzymes.

In nature, enzymes called Baeyer-Villiger monooxygenases (BVMOs) perform the oxidation analogously to the chemical reaction. To facilitate this chemistry, BVMOs contain a flavin adenine dinucleotide (FAD) cofactor. In the catalytic cycle (see figure on the right), the cellular redox equivalent NADPH first reduces the cofactor, which allows it subsequently to react with molecular oxygen. The resulting peroxyflavin is the catalytic entity oxygenating the substrate, and theoretical studies suggest that the reaction proceeds through the same Criegee intermediate as observed in the chemical reaction. After the rearrangement step forming the ester product, a hydroxyflavin remains, which spontaneously eliminates water to form oxidized flavin, thereby closing the catalytic cycle.

BVMOs are closely related to the flavin-containing monooxygenases (FMOs), enzymes that also occur in the human body, functioning within the frontline metabolic detoxification system of the liver along the cytochrome P450 monooxygenases. Human FMO5 was in fact shown to be able to catalyse Baeyer-Villiger reactions, indicating that the reaction may occur in the human body as well.

BVMOs have been widely studied due to their potential as biocatalysts, that is, for an application in organic synthesis. Considering the environmental concerns for most of the chemical catalysts, the use of enzymes is considered a greener alternative. BVMOs in particular are interesting for application because they fulfil a range of criteria typically sought for in biocatalysis: besides their ability to catalyse a synthetically useful reaction, some natural homologs were found to have a very large substrate scope (i.e. their reactivity was not restricted to a single compound, as often assumed in enzyme catalysis), they can be easily produced on a large scale, and because the three-dimensional structure of many BVMOs has been determined, enzyme engineering could be applied to produce variants with improved thermostability and/or reactivity. Another advantage of using enzymes for the reaction is their frequently observed regio- and enantioselectivity, owed to the steric control of substrate orientation during catalysis within the enzyme's active site.

== Example applications in total synthesis ==
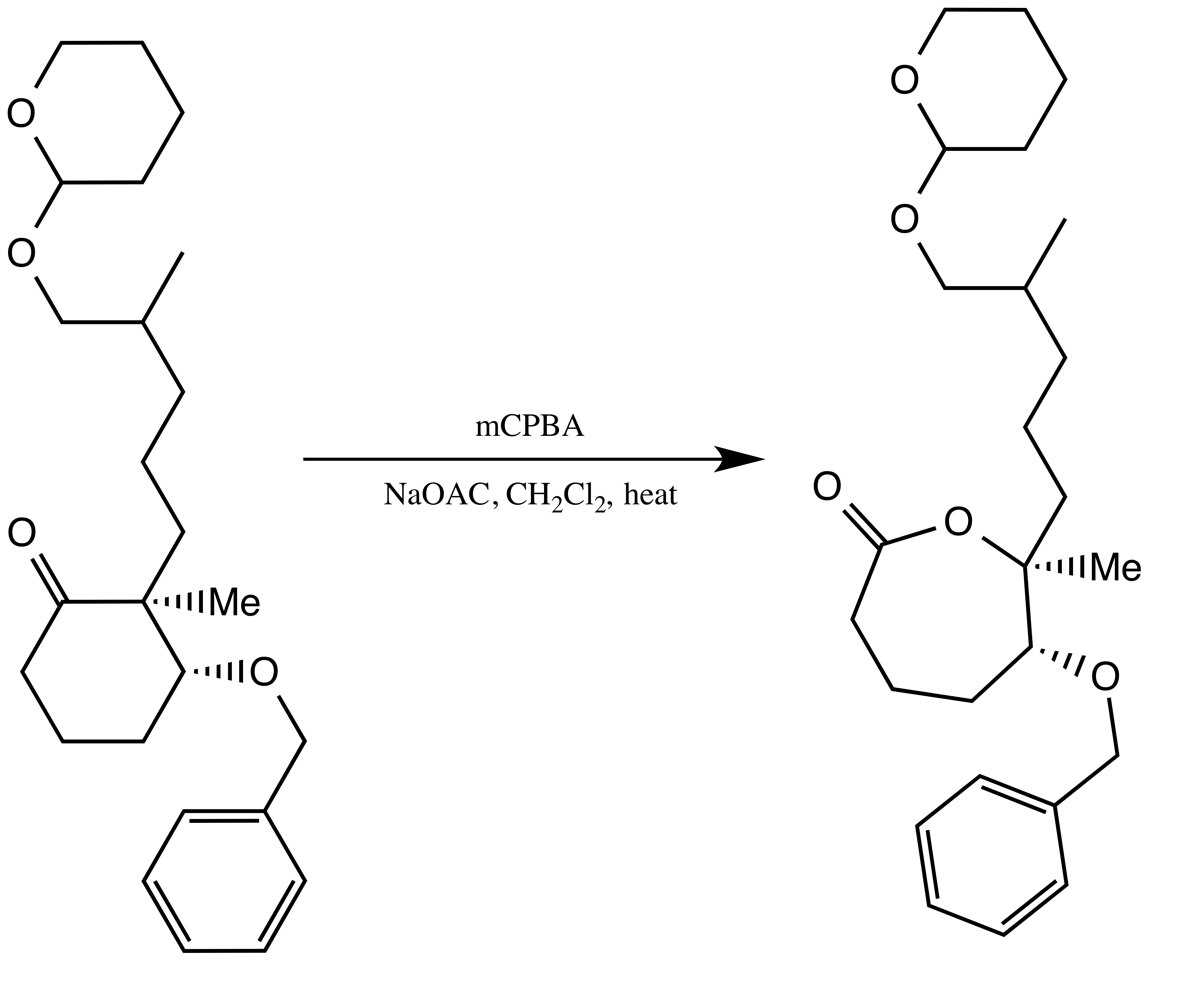
Use of Baeyer-Villiger oxidation en route to zoapatanol.

Zoapatanol, from the zeopatle plant, has been prepared by the Baeyer–Villiger oxidation to make a lactone.

The steroid dehydroepiandrosterone converts to the anticancer agent testololactone induced by fungus that produces Baeyer-Villiger monooxygenases.

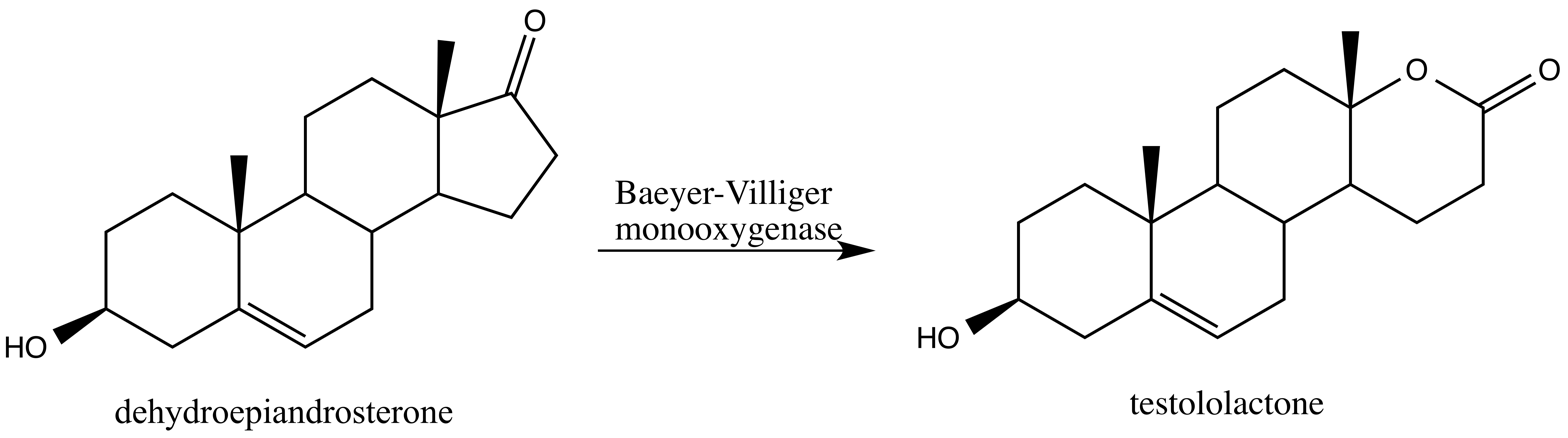
Świzdor reported that a Baeyer-Villiger monooxygenase could change dehydroepiandrosterone into testololactone

== See also ==
- Dakin reaction—dioxiranes from arene aldehydes form a para phenol, rather than insert an oxygen into the ring
- Rubottom oxidation—oxidation of an enolate prevents rearrangement
- Schmidt reaction—converts ketones to amides or lactams
