= Peroxy acid =

Organic acid with an –OOH group

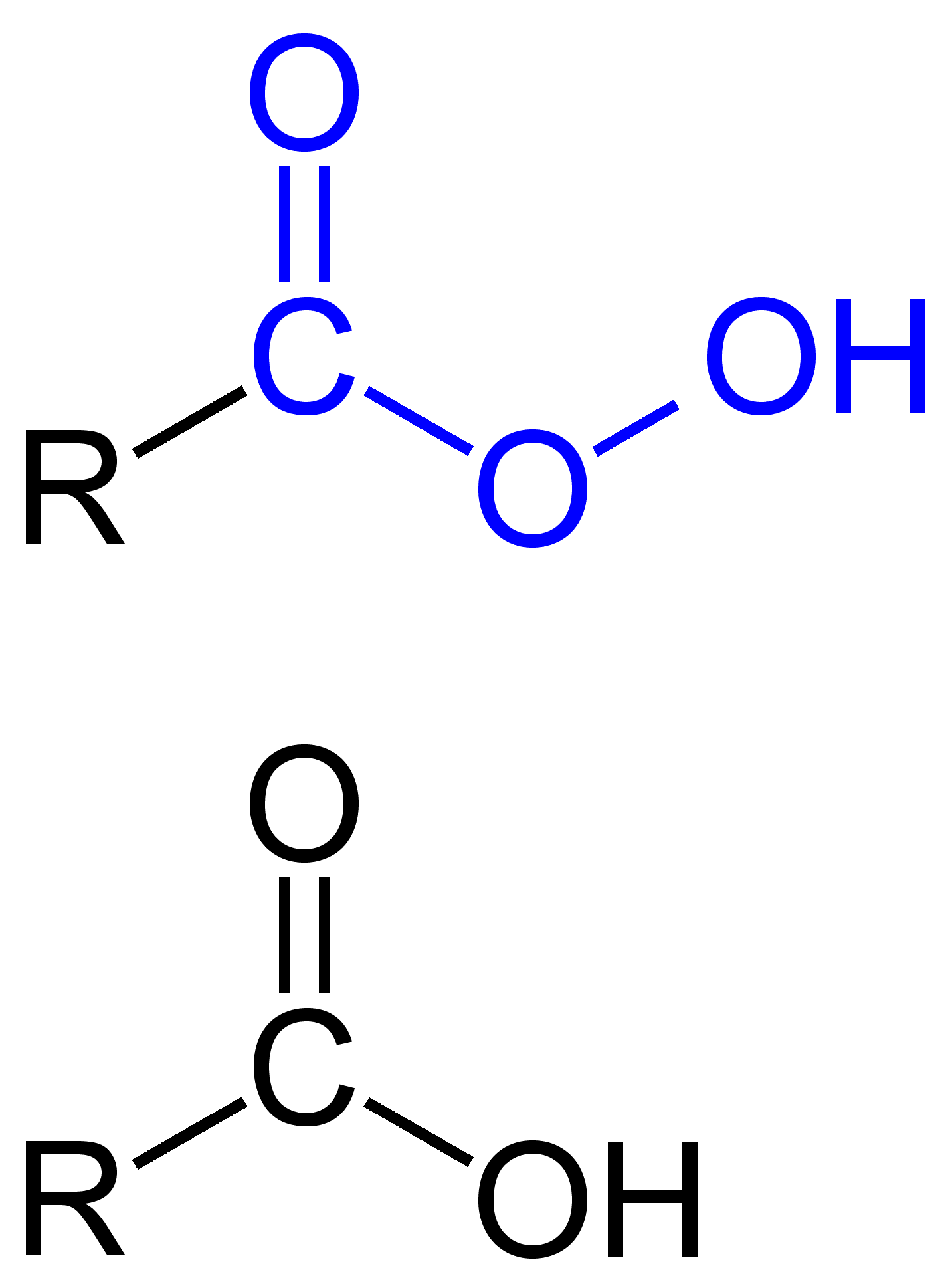
General formulas of an organic peroxy acid (top) compared with a carboxylic acid (bottom).

A peroxy acid (often spelled as one word, peroxyacid, and sometimes called peracid) is an acid which contains an acidic −OOH group. The two main classes are those derived from conventional mineral acids, especially sulfuric acid, and the peroxy derivatives of organic carboxylic acids. They are generally strong oxidizers.

== Inorganic peroxy acids ==
Peroxymonosulfuric acid (Caro's acid) is probably the most important inorganic peracid, at least in terms of its production scale. It is used for the bleaching of pulp and for the detoxification of cyanide in the mining industry. It is produced by treating sulfuric acid with hydrogen peroxide. Peroxymonophosphoric acid (H_{3}PO_{5}) is prepared similarly.

Some peroxy acids are only hypothetical, but their anions are known. This is the case for peroxycarbonate and perborate (see sodium perborate).

== Organic peracids ==
=== Production ===
Several organic peroxyacids are commercially useful. They can be prepared in several ways. Most commonly, peracids are generated by treating the corresponding carboxylic acid with hydrogen peroxide:

RCO_{2}H + H_{2}O_{2} ⇌ RCO_{3}H + H_{2}O

A related reaction involves treatment of the carboxylic anhydride:

(RCO)_{2}O + H_{2}O_{2} → RCO_{3}H + RCO_{2}H

This method is popular for converting cyclic anhydrides to the corresponding monoperoxyacids, for example monoperoxyphthalic acid.

The third method involves treatment of acyl chlorides:

RC(O)Cl + H_{2}O_{2} → RCO_{3}H + HCl

meta-Chloroperoxybenzoic acid (mCPBA) is prepared in this way:

m-chlorobenzoyl chloride + hydrogen peroxide → m-chloroperoxybenzoic acid

A related method starts with the peroxyanhydride.

Aromatic aldehydes can be autoxidized to give peroxycarboxylic acids:

Ar−CHO + O_{2} → Ar−COOOH (Ar = aryl group)

The products, however, react with the initial aldehyde forming the carboxylic acid:

Ar−COOOH + Ar−CHO → 2 Ar−COOH

=== Properties and uses ===
In terms of acidity, peroxycarboxylic acids are about 1000 times weaker than the parent carboxylic acid, due to the absence of resonance stabilization of the anion. For similar reasons, their pK_{a} values tend also to be relatively insensitive to substituents; all are between 7.2 and 8.2.

The most common use of organic peroxy acids is for the conversion of alkenes to epoxides, the Prilezhaev reaction.

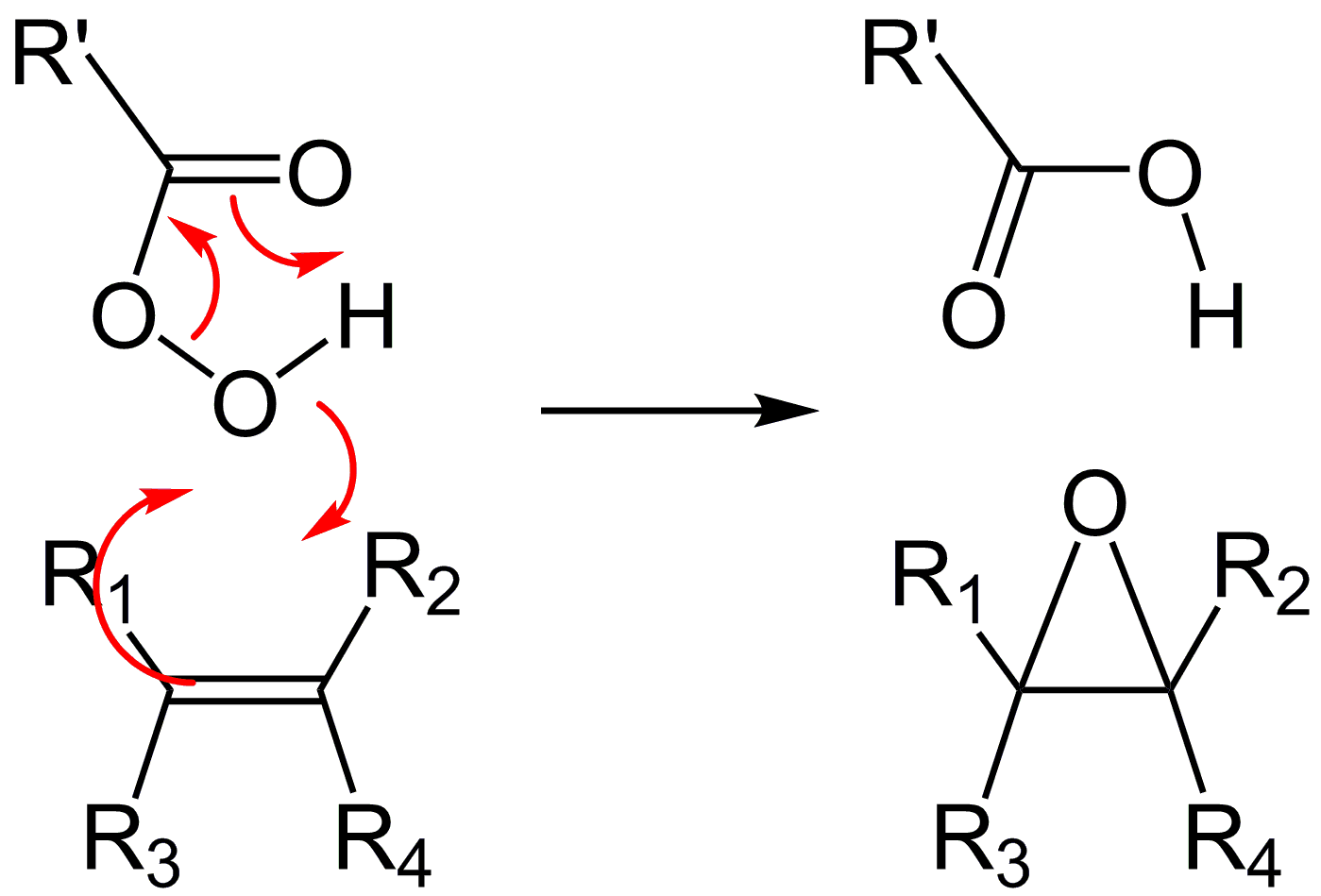
Formation of an epoxide from an alkene and a peroxycarboxylic acid.

Another common reaction is conversion of cyclic ketones to the ring-expanded esters using peracids in a Baeyer-Villiger oxidation. They are also used for the oxidation of amines and thioethers to amine oxides and sulfoxides. The laboratory applications of the valued reagent mCPBA illustrate these reactions.

Reaction of peroxycarboxylic acids with acid chlorides affords diacyl peroxides:

RC(O)Cl + RC(O)O_{2}H → (RC(O))_{2}O_{2} + HCl

The oxidizing tendency of peroxides is related to the electronegativity of the substituents. Electrophilic peroxides are stronger oxygen-atom transfer agents. The oxygen-atom donor tendency correlates with the acidity of the O−H bond. Thus, the order of oxidizing power is CF_{3}CO_{3}H > CH_{3}CO_{3}H > H_{2}O_{2}.

== Usage ==
Peroxycarboxylic acids are available in both solid and liquid forms. Due to their oxidizing and disinfecting properties, they can be used in both professional and domestic settings.

=== Bleaching agents ===
Peroxycarboxylic acids are bleaching agents and are used globally, particularly for tooth whitening. They are employed in various concentrations in dentistry to effectively bleach teeth. Lower concentrations are common for home use. Compared to hydrogen peroxide, peroxycarboxylic acids are approved as cosmetics in Europe under Regulation (EC) No. 1223/2009 of the European Parliament.

=== Disinfectants ===
In healthcare, peroxycarboxylic acids are primarily used for wound disinfection and cleaning contact lenses.

Peroxycarboxylic acids are also found in cleaning agents, disinfectants, and detergents, as they reliably kill germs and bacteria.

== See also ==
- Organic peroxide
- Peracetic acid
- Peroxyacyl nitrates
