= C5H8O3 =

The molecular formula C_{5}H_{8}O_{3} may refer to:

- Butylene carbonates
  - 1,2-Butylene carbonate
  - cis-2,3-Butylene carbonate
  - trans-2,3-Butylene carbonate
- Hydroxyethyl acrylate
- α-Ketoisovaleric acid
- α-Ketovaleric acid
- Levulinic acid
- Methyl acetoacetate
- 3-Oxopentanoic acid
- Tetrahydro-2-furoic acid
