= C4H8O2 =

The molecular formula C_{4}H_{8}O_{2} may refer to:

- Acetoin
- cis-Butene-1,4-diol
- Butyric acid
- Dioxanes
  - 1,2-Dioxane
  - 1,3-Dioxane
  - 1,4-Dioxane
- Ethyl acetate
- 3-Hydroxybutanal
- γ-Hydroxybutyraldehyde
- 3-Hydroxytetrahydrofuran
- Isobutyric acid
- Methyl propanoate
- Propyl formate
- Isopropyl formate
