= Butylene carbonate =

Butylene carbonate usually refers to 1,2-Butylene carbonate, but it may also refer to:

- cis-2,3-Butylene carbonate
- trans-2,3-Butylene carbonate

== See also ==
- Propylene carbonate
- Ethylene carbonate, or dioxolan-2-one
