= Trifluoroperacetic acid =

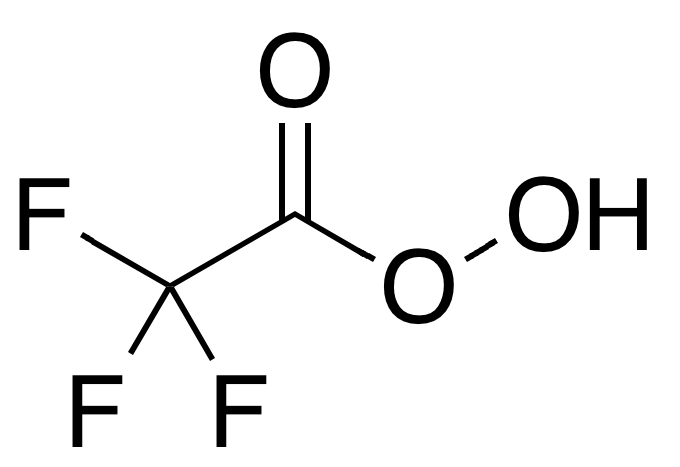

Names
- Preferred IUPAC name Trifluoroethaneperoxoic acid
- Other names: Peroxytrifluoroacetic acid; Trifluoroethanperoxoic acid; Trifluoroperacetic acid; Trifluoroperoxyacetic acid; TFPAA

Identifiers
CAS Number	359-48-8
3D model (JSmol)	Interactive image
ChemSpider	8466281
PubChem CID	10290812
UNII	PU9V6QCS3Q
CompTox Dashboard (EPA)	DTXSID601337101
- InChI: Key: XYPISWUKQGWYGX-UHFFFAOYSA-N
- SMILES: C(=O)(C(F)(F)F)OO

Properties
Chemical formula	C_{2}HF_{3}O_{3}
Molar mass	130.022 g·mol^{−1}
Appearance	colourless liquid
Boiling point	162 °C (324 °F; 435 K)
Solubility	soluble in acetonitrile, dichloromethane, diethyl ether, sulfolane
- Except where otherwise noted, data are given for materials in their standard state (at 25 °C [77 °F], 100 kPa). Infobox references

Trifluoroperacetic acid (trifluoroperoxyacetic acid, TFPAA) is an organofluorine compound, the peroxy acid analog of trifluoroacetic acid, with the condensed structural formula CF_{3}COOOH. (Note: Three condensed structural formulae are used to represent trifluoroperacetic acid, CF_{3}COOOH, CF_{3}CO_{3}H, and CF_{3}C(O)OOH. They are equivalent and can be used interchangeably.) It is a strong oxidizing agent for organic oxidation reactions, such as in Baeyer–Villiger oxidations of ketones. It is the most reactive of the organic peroxy acids, allowing it to successfully oxidise relatively unreactive alkenes to epoxides where other peroxy acids are ineffective. It can also oxidise the chalcogens in some functional groups, such as by transforming selenoethers to selones. It is a potentially explosive material and is not commercially available, but it can be quickly prepared as needed. Its use as a laboratory reagent was pioneered and developed by William D. Emmons.

== Properties ==
At standard ambient temperature and pressure, trifluoroperacetic acid is a colourless liquid with a boiling point of 162 °C. It is soluble in acetonitrile, dichloromethane, diethyl ether, and sulfolane, and readily reacts with water. Like all peroxy acids, it is potentially explosive and requires careful handling. It is not commercially available, but can be made in the lab and stored for up to several weeks at −20 °C. Some preparative methods result in mixtures containing residual hydrogen peroxide and trifluoroacetic acid, and heating such a mixture is extremely hazardous; the hydrogen peroxide can be decomposed using manganese dioxide for safety before heating.

== Preparation ==
Trifluoroperacetic acid can be easily prepared by an Organic Syntheses process of treating trifluoroacetic anhydride with a concentrated (90%) aqueous solution of hydrogen peroxide:

CF_{3}COOCOCF_{3} + H_{2}O_{2} → CF_{3}COOOH + CF_{3}COOH

As the anhydride will form trifluoroacetic acid in contact with water, an excess of the anhydride also serves to remove the solvent from the peroxide reactant:

CF_{3}COOCOCF_{3} + H_{2}O → 2 CF_{3}COOH

A more dilute hydrogen peroxide solution (30%) can be used to form trifluoroperacetic acid for some reactions from trifluoroacetic acid.

CF_{3}COOH + H_{2}O_{2} → CF_{3}COOOH + H_{2}O

In order to avoid the danger of handling pure or highly concentrated solutions of hydrogen peroxide, hydrogen peroxide – urea can be used to give the peracid. This method involves no water, so it gives a completely anhydrous peracid, which is an advantage when the presence of water leads to side reactions during certain oxidation reactions.

CF_{3}COOCOCF_{3} + H_{2}O_{2}·CO(NH_{2})_{2} → CF_{3}COOOH + CF_{3}COOH + CO(NH_{2})_{2}

In cases where a pH buffering agent is needed for a synthesis and where the presence of water is tolerated, another approach has been developed. Reacting trifluoroacetic anhydride with sodium percarbonate, 2Na_{2}CO_{3}·3H_{2}O_{2}, yields trifluoroperacetic acid and sodium carbonate, obviating the need for an additional buffer.

3 CF_{3}COOCOCF_{3} + 4 Na_{2}CO_{3}·3/2H_{2}O_{2} → 6 CF_{3}COOOH + 4 Na_{2}CO_{3} + 3 H_{2}O

Trifluoroperacetic acid can also be generated in situ, allowing it to react promptly with the target substrate rather than pre-synthesizing a batch of the reagent for later use.

== History and uses ==
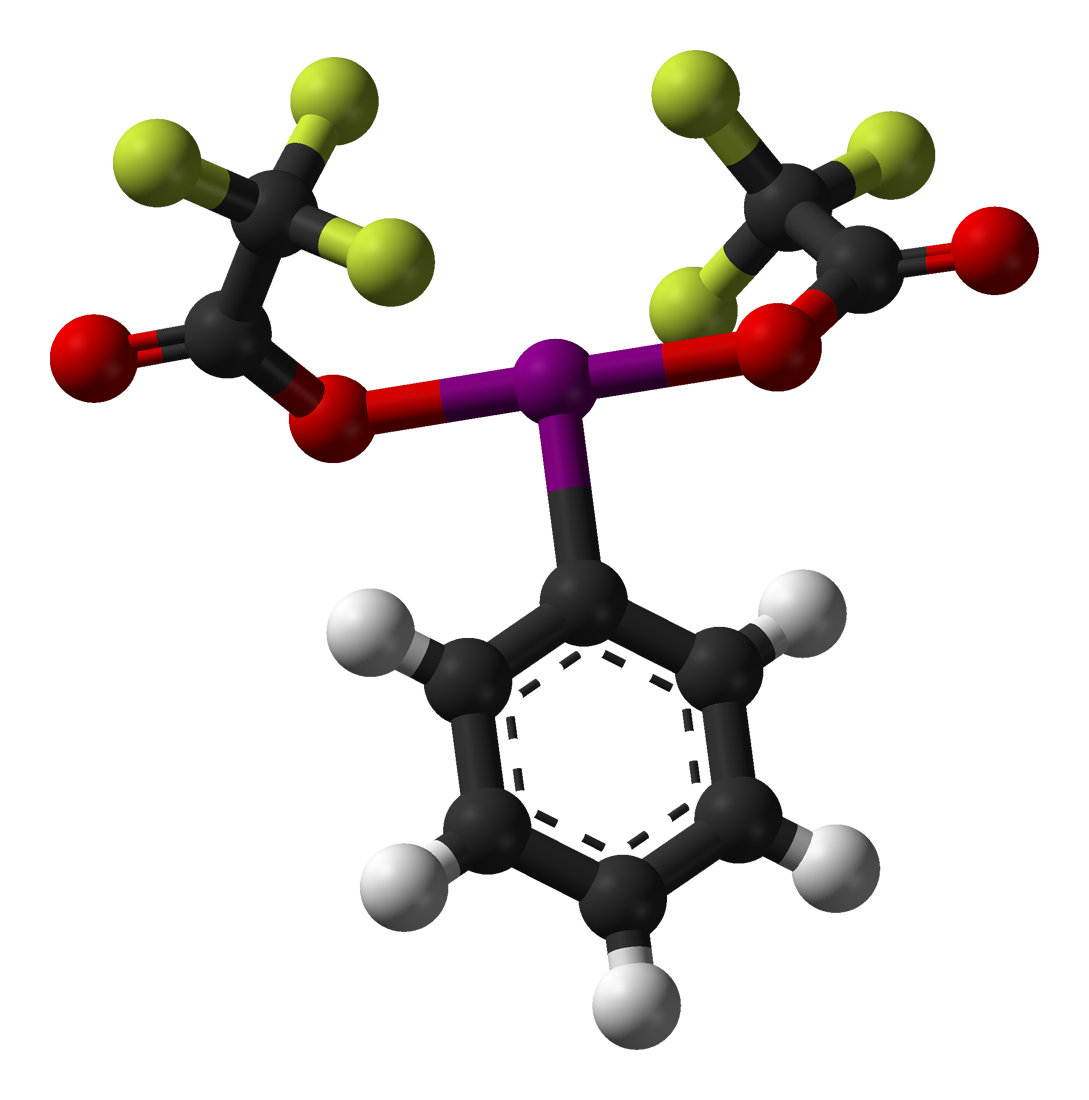
(Bis(trifluoroacetoxy)iodo)benzene, C_{6}H_{5}I(OOCCF_{3})_{2}

Trifluoroperacetic acid is primarily used as an oxidising agent. In September 1953, the Journal of the American Chemical Society published work by William D. Emmons and Arthur F. Ferris reporting that this reagent, generated in situ, was capable of oxidising aniline to nitrobenzene. Over the following two years, Emmons reported a preparative method for this reagent and published six further manuscripts in this journal on its applications. Emmons is remembered in part as the pioneer and developer of trifluoroperacetic acid as a laboratory reagent, which has since become useful as a reagent for many different types of synthetic reactions.

One example is the formation of the hypervalent iodine compound (bis(trifluoroacetoxy)iodo)benzene, (CF_{3}COO)_{2}IC_{6}H_{5} which is used to carry out the Hofmann rearrangement under acidic conditions. The hypervalent compound is accessible in two ways, and which is chosen usually depends on what materials are available: it can be prepared from its acetate analogue by an exchange reaction, or by reacting iodobenzene with a combination of trifluoroperacetic acid and trifluoroacetic acid:

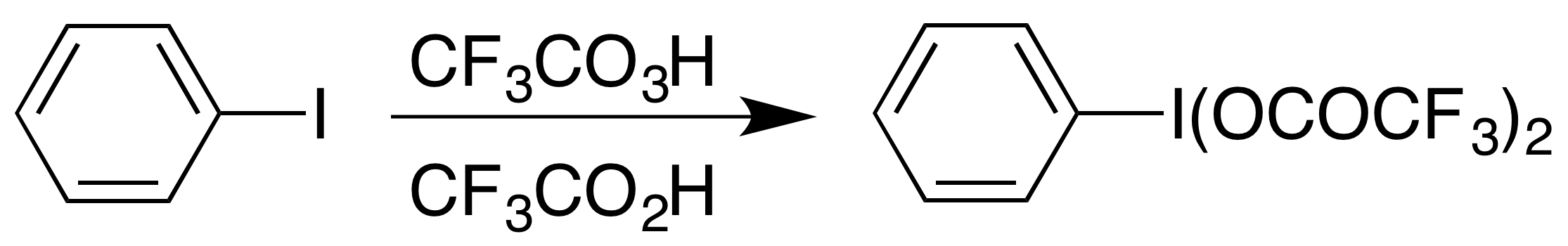

=== Baeyer–Villiger oxidation ===
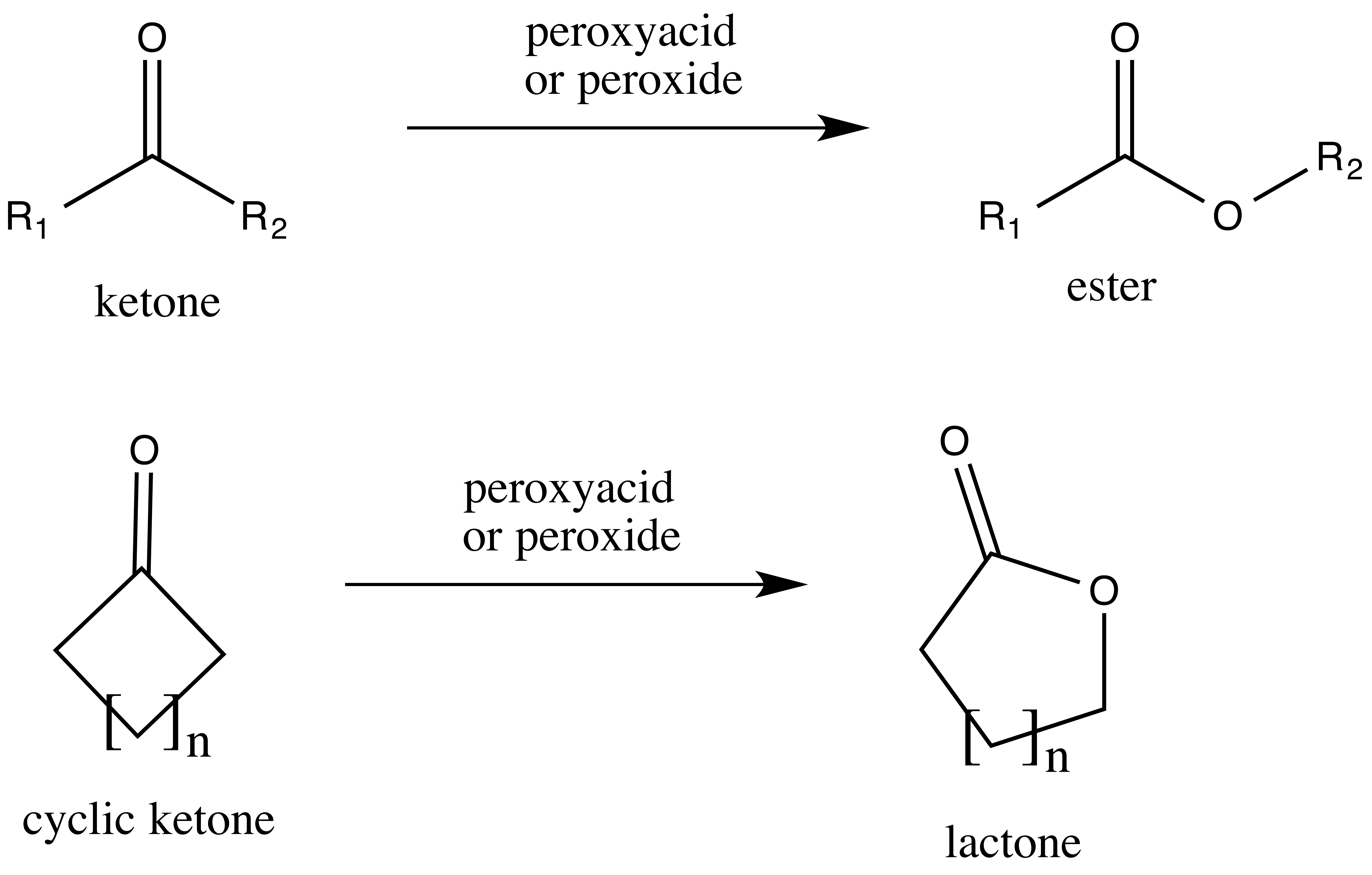
Generalised Baeyer-Villiger oxidation of linear and cyclic ketones

Trifluoroperacetic acid is one of the strongest reagents used for Baeyer–Villiger oxidations, as a consequence of its high acidity relative to similar peracids and peroxides. This reaction converts ketones to either straight-chain esters or lactones, and is named for Adolf von Baeyer and Victor Villiger, who first reported it 1899. The reaction is believed to proceed via a Criegee intermediate and demonstrates good regioselectivity and chemoselectivity for the position of oxygen atom insertion, along with retention of stereochemistry at the adjacent position, as can be seen in the following example. The disodium phosphate (Na_{2}HPO_{4}) is added as a pH buffer to prevent the highly acidic trifluoroacetic acid byproduct from causing hydrolysis or transesterification of the ester product.

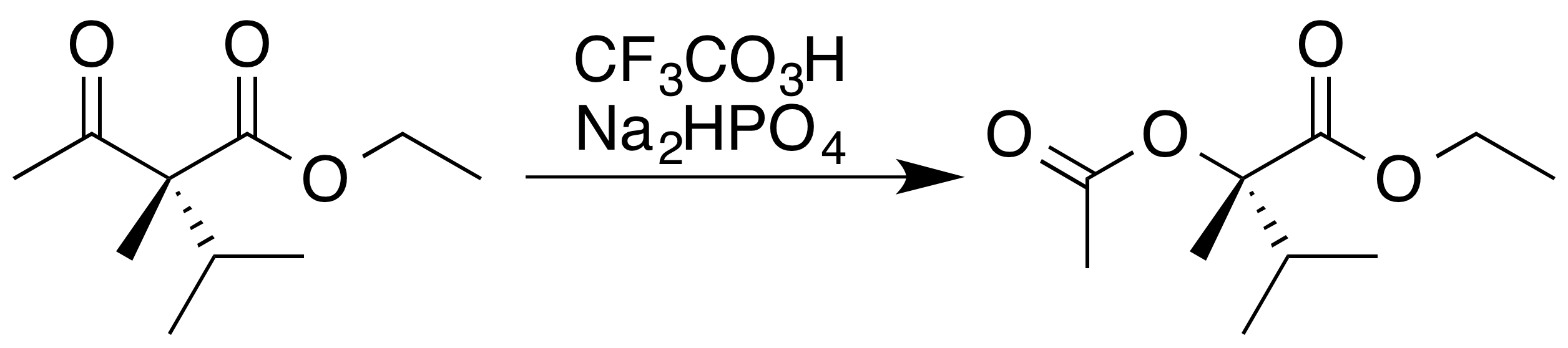

=== Epoxidation ===
The Prilezhaev reaction involves the conversion of an alkene to an epoxide using a peracid as the oxidant and was first reported in 1909. The reaction has been used as the final step of the synthesis of scopine, a tropane alkaloid. In this approach, a [4+3] cycloaddition mediated by diiron nonacarbonyl is used to construct the bicyclic skeleton, the hydroxyl functional group is then introduced by diastereoselective reduction of the ketone with diisobutylaluminum hydride, and the preparation completed with a Prilezhaev trifluoroperacetic acid epoxidation.

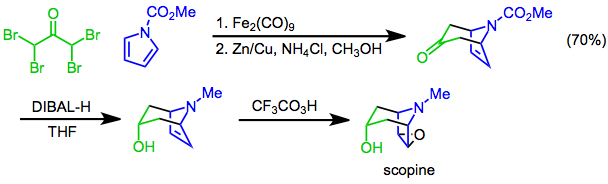

The high reactivity of trifluoroperacetic acid relative to other peroxy acids allows it to successfully oxidize relatively electron-poor alkenes such as 1-hexene and α,β-unsaturated esters such as methyl methacrylate, substrates that are generally resistant to peroxy-acid epoxidation. Including additional buffered trifluoroacetic acid in the mixture gives a vicinal hydroxy–trifluoroacetate structure instead of an epoxide, which can be converted to the diol by treatment with acidic methanol, such as in the following conversion of 1-dodecene to 1,2-dodecanediol.

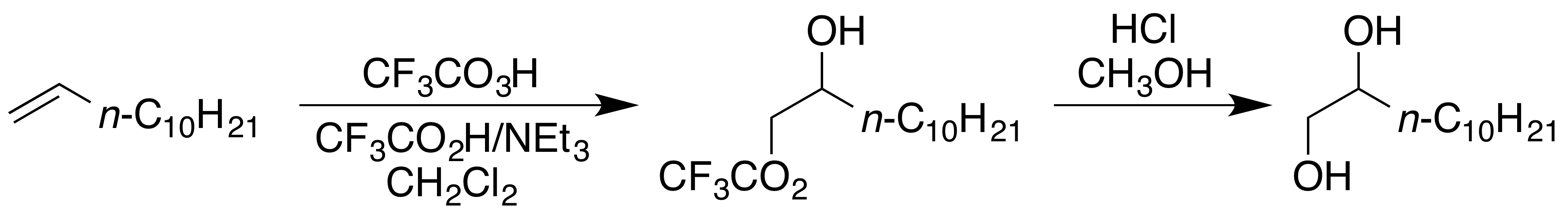

In the case of an allyl alcohol compound with a proximate carbonyl functional group, the epoxide can undergo a ring-expansion reaction to form a dioxolane. The process below was used as part of the total synthesis of neosporol, a natural product:

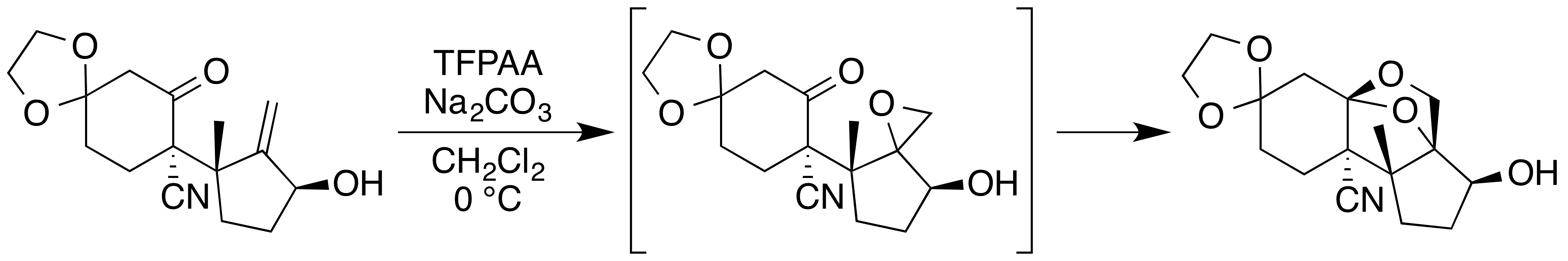

The preparation of the isomeric compound sporol involved a similar dioxolane formation. In this case, the use of trifluoroperacetic acid derived from hydrogen peroxide, which therefore presumably contained traces of water, gave mostly a hemiacetal rather than the closed-ring dioxolane. The use of the urea complex, which gave a water-free material, successfully gave the dioxolane as the major product. The dioxolane is expanded to the 1,3-dioxane system found in sporol at a later step in the synthesis.

=== Heteroatom oxidation ===
Functional groups containing heteroatoms in low oxidation states can be oxidised by trifluoroperacetic acid. Common cases include the oxidation of iodine (for example, the formation of the hypervalent iodine compound from iodobenzene mentioned earlier), nitrogen, sulfur, and selenium.

In the case of nitrogen-containing compounds, known transformations include oximes and aromatic primary amines to nitro compounds (even with electron-withdrawing substituents, for example, pentafluoroaniline to pentafluoronitrobenzene), nitrosamines to nitramines, formation of aromatic N-oxides and aromatic azine N-oxides, and conversion of nitroso compounds to nitro compounds or nitramines. For example, a mixture of hydrogen peroxide and trifluoroperacetic acid oxidises the nitroso-substituted pyrimidine 4,6-diamino-5-nitrosopyrimidine-2-thiol to its nitro analogue while also removing the thiol moiety by oxidative hydrolytic desulfurization:

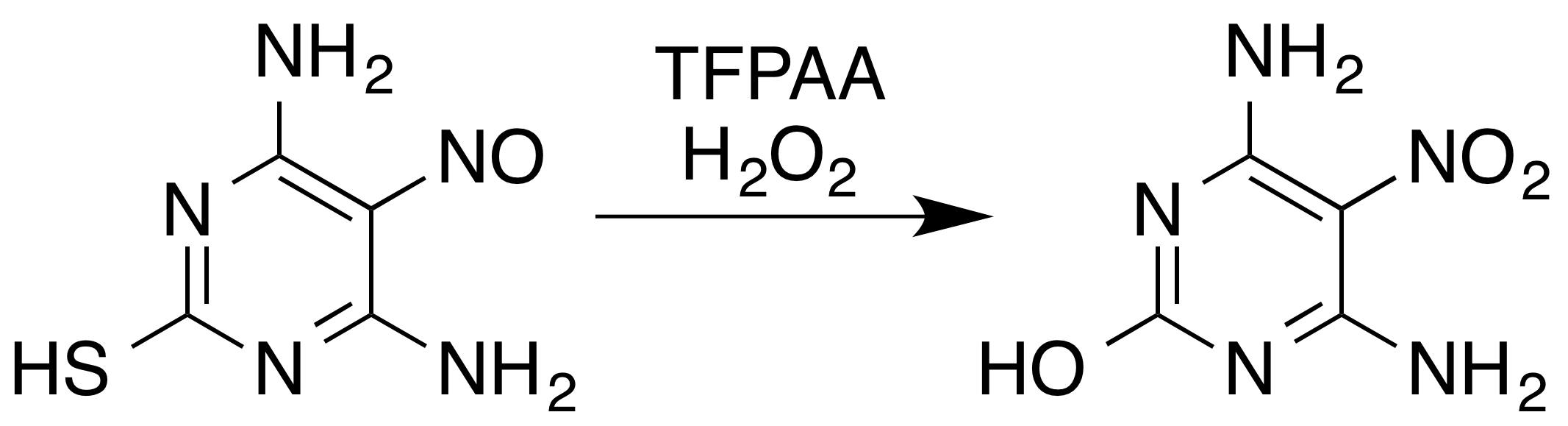

In the case of chalcogen elements, sulfide moieties (R–S–R) can be oxidised by trifluoroperacetic acid to sulfoxide (R–S(O)–R) and/or sulfone (R–S(O)_{2}–R) forms, depending on the conditions used. In the analogous selenium system, trifluoroperacetic acid oxidation of selenoethers (R–Se–R) produces selones (R–Se(O)_{2}–R) without the formation of the related selenoxides (R–Se(O)–R) as an isolable product, a reaction which is particularly effective when the R is an aryl group. A general approach to the formation of sulfinyl chlorides (RS(O)Cl) is the reaction of the corresponding thiol with sulfuryl chloride (SO_{2}Cl_{2}). In cases where the sulfenyl chloride (RSCl) results instead, a subsequent trifluoroperacetic acid oxidation affords the desired product, as in the case of 2,2,2-trifluoro-1,1-diphenylethanethiol:

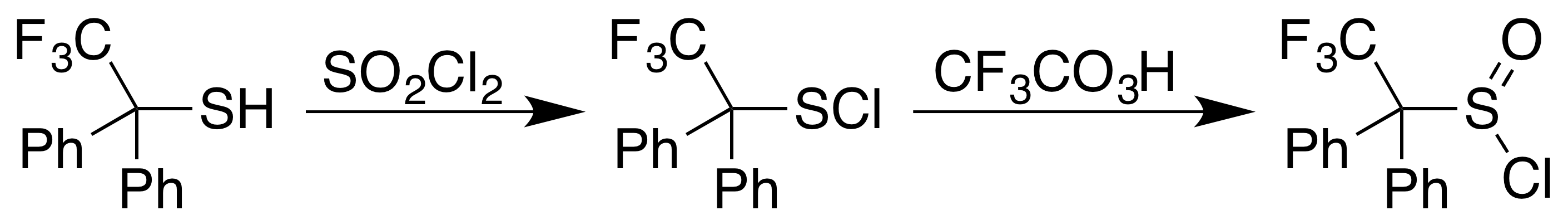

The trifluoroperacetic acid oxidation of thiophene illustrates competing pathways for reaction, with both S-oxidation and epoxidation being possible. (Note: Such competitions can have biochemical significance. For example, it is known that the loop diuretic pharmaceutical agent tienilic acid acts as a suicide substrate at cytochrome P450 enzymes and that the process involves thiophene oxidation, but the oxidation pathway responsible remains unclear despite considerable research activity.) The major pathway initially forms the sulfoxide, but this chemical promptly undergoes a Diels-Alder-type dimerisation before any further oxidation occurs—neither thiophene-S-oxide or thiophene-S,S-dioxide are found among the products of the reaction. The dimer can then be oxidized further, converting one of the S-oxide moieties to an S,S-dioxide. In the minor reaction pathway, a Prilezhaev epoxidation results in the formation of thiophene-2,3-epoxide that rapidly rearranges to the isomer thiophene-2-one. Trapping experiments demonstrate that this epoxide pathway is not an alternative reaction of the S-oxide intermediate, and isotopic labeling experiments demonstrate that a 1,2-hydride shift (an NIH shift) occurs and thus that a cationic intermediate is involved. The choice of trifluoroperacetic acid preparation method is important as water suppresses the minor reaction pathway, likely because it acts as a competing base.

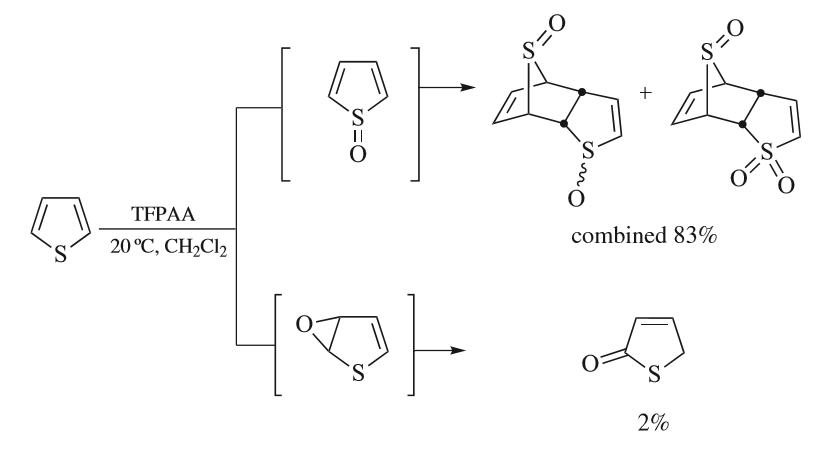

=== Oxidation with acidic rearrangement ===
The use of trifluoroperacetic acid with boron trifluoride causes oxidation of alkenes and aromatic rings with concomitant rearrangement of the molecular skeleton.

For alkenes, the reaction gives a ketone product, though the mechanistic process is not simply epoxidation followed by a BF_{3}-catalyzed Wagner–Meerwein rearrangement:

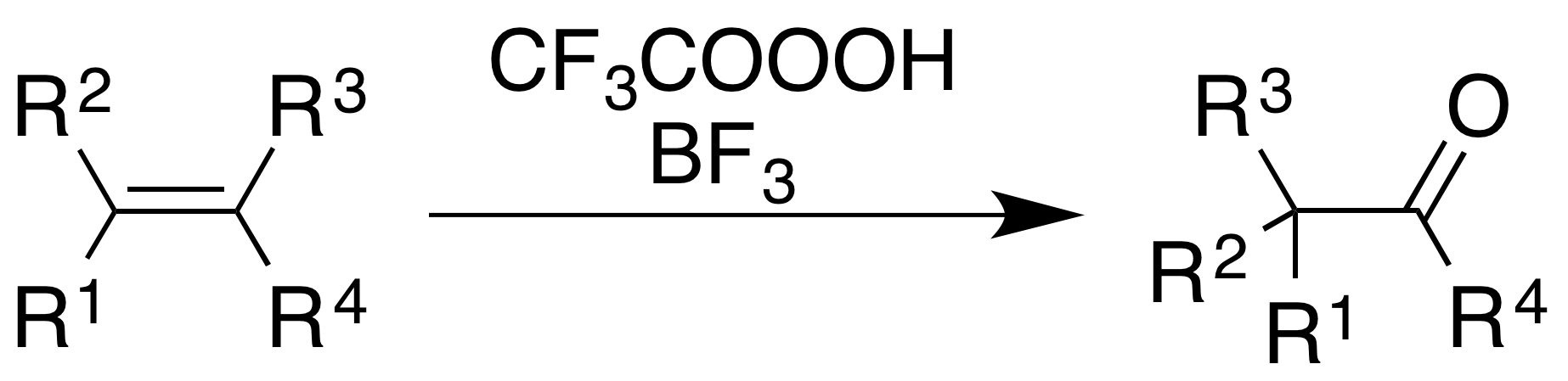

For aromatics, an example demonstrated in an Organic Syntheses report is the conversion of hexamethylbenzene to 2,3,4,5,6,6-hexamethyl-2,4-cyclohexadienone:

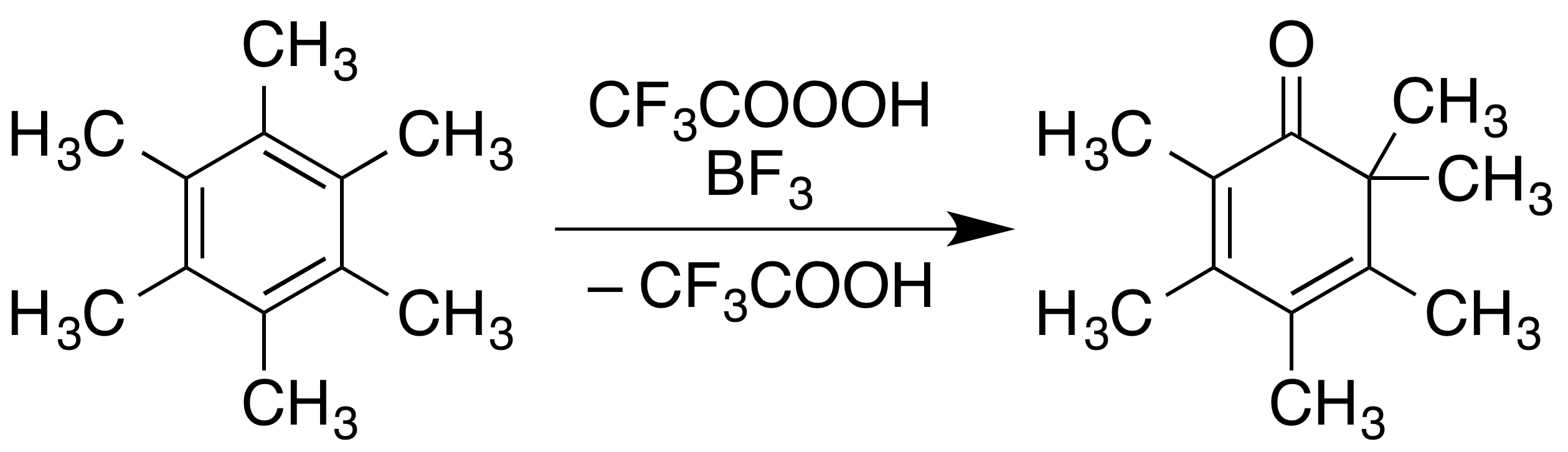

=== Oxidative cleavage of arenes ===
In addition to simple oxidation of aromatic rings to form carbonyl compounds (see § Oxidation with acidic rearrangement), trifluoroperacetic acid can fully cleave the carbon–carbon bonds within the ring. Unlike other oxidations of alkylaromatic structures, which yield benzoic acids and related compounds by cleavage of the alkyl chain at the reactive benzylic position, trifluoroperacetic acid causes an "inverse oxidation", cleaving the aromatic ring itself while leaving the alkyl group intact.

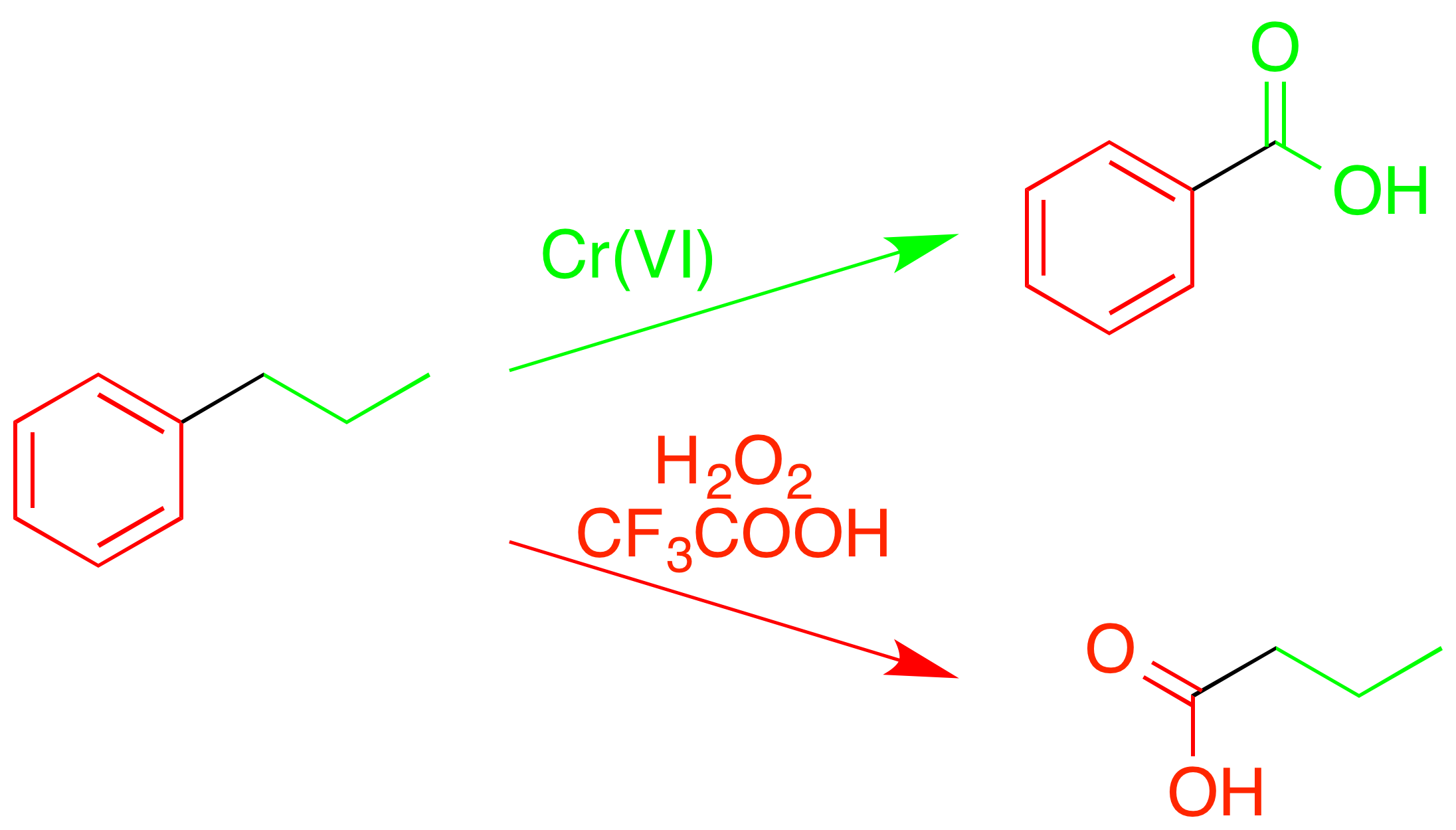

This selectivity for certain types of bonds allows it to be used to decompose complex mixtures of hydrocarbons, such as coal, in order to determine structural details.

Aromatic systems containing heteroatoms are resistant to this ring-opening as heteroatom oxidation occurs preferentially and deactivates the ring towards electrophilic attack by the peroxy acid. For example, purines, pyridines, and quinolines instead form N-oxides, while sulfur systems like octafluorodibenzothiophene are converted to sulfones.

Aromatic systems with ring-activating substituents can be oxidised to form phenols instead of undergoing a ring-opening reaction. Mesitylene, for example, reacts with trifluoroperacetic acid to form mesitol (2,4,6-trimethylphenol). Researchers attempting to form a lactone by Baeyer–Villiger oxidation of 7-oxodeacetamidocolchicine were unable to prepare the desired product, but did achieve oxidation of the aromatic ring to produce a phenol-derivative in high yield:

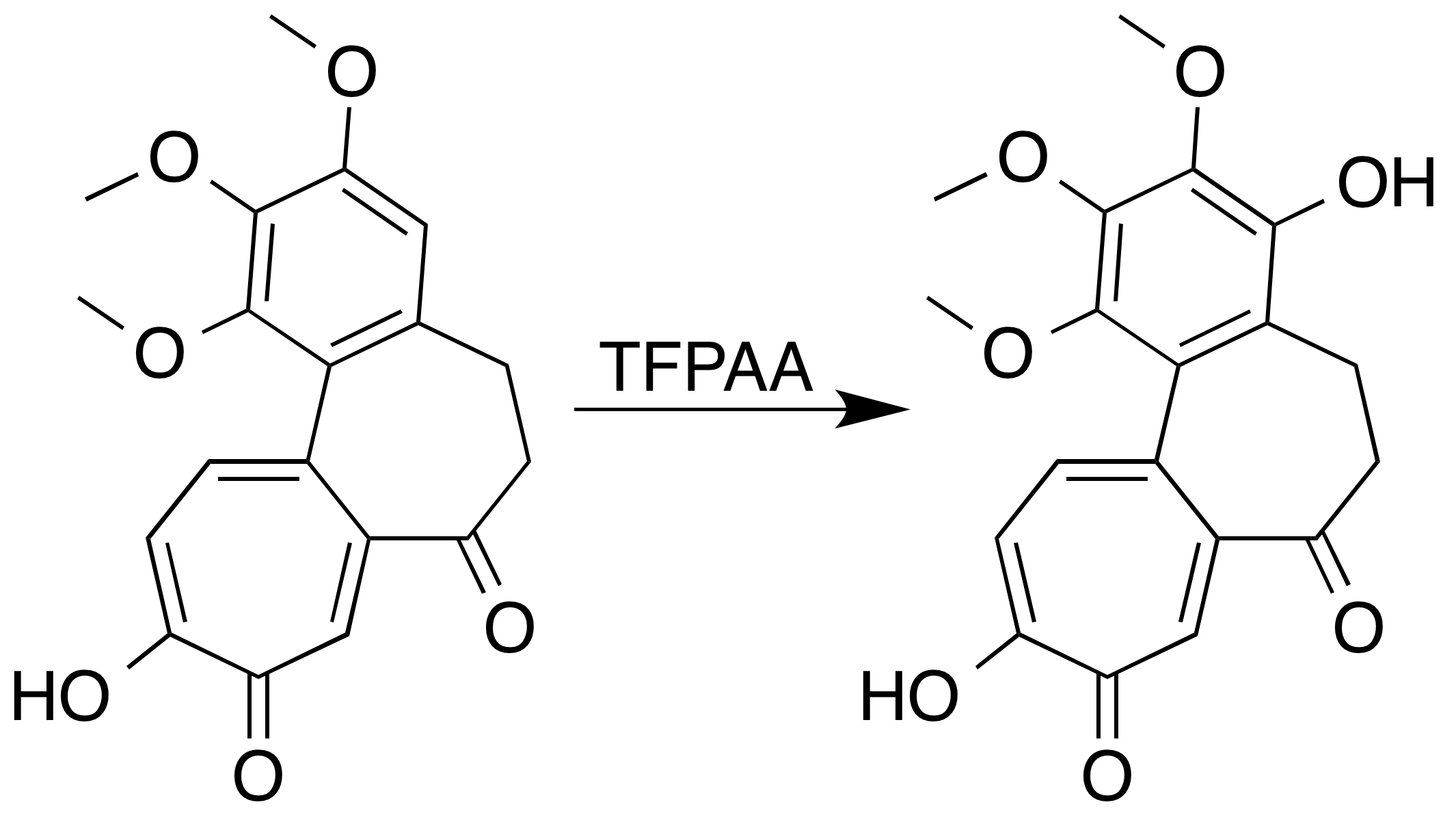
