= Ketovaleric acid =

Ketovaleric acid may refer to:

- α-Ketovaleric acid
- β-Ketovaleric acid (3-oxopentanoic acid)
- γ-Ketovaleric acid (levulinic acid)
