= Ketovalerate =

Ketovalerate may refer to:

- α-Ketovalerate (α-ketovaleric acid)
- β-Ketovalerate (3-oxopentanoic acid)
- γ-Ketovalerate (levulinic acid)
