= 2,3-Butylene carbonate =

2,3-Butylene carbonate, a chemical substance, may refer to:

- cis-2,3-Butylene carbonate
- trans-2,3-Butylene carbonate
