= HEA =

HEA or Hea may refer to:

== Education ==
- Higher Education Academy, a British charity
- Higher Education Act of 1965, United States
- Higher Education Act 2004, United Kingdom
- Higher Education Authority, Republic of Ireland

== Science ==
- Hea (cicada), a genus of cicadas
- Hektoen enteric agar, used in microbiology to identify certain organisms
- High-entropy alloys, a new class of multi-component alloys in materials science
- Hydroxyethyl acrylate, organic compound

== Other uses ==
- Happily ever after, a fairytale ending
- Herat International Airport (IATA:HEA)
- Hockey East Association, an American hockey conference

== See also ==
- Happily Ever After (disambiguation)
