= 3,4-Dihydropyran =

Dihydropyran
- 3,4-dihydropyran skelet

Names
- Preferred IUPAC name 3,4-Dihydro-2H-pyran
- Other names 2,3-Dihydro-4H-pyran, DHP

Identifiers
CAS Number	110-87-2
3D model (JSmol)	3,4 isomer: Interactive image
ChEMBL	ChEMBL3184439
ChemSpider	7789
ECHA InfoCard	100.003.465
EC Number	203-810-4
PubChem CID	8080
UNII	T6V9N71IHX
UN number	2376
CompTox Dashboard (EPA)	DTXSID6041426
- InChI: InChI=1/C5H8O/c1-2-4-6-5-3-1/h2,4H,1,3,5H2 Key: BUDQDWGNQVEFAC-UHFFFAOYAJ
- SMILES: 3,4 isomer: O1\C=C/CCC1

Properties
Chemical formula	C_{5}H_{8}O
Molar mass	84.118 g·mol^{−1}
Appearance	Colorless liquid
Density	0.922 g/mL
Melting point	−70 °C (−94 °F; 203 K)
Boiling point	86 °C (187 °F; 359 K)

Hazards
- GHS labelling
Pictograms	(GHS02: Flammable) (GHS07: Exclamation mark)
Signal word	Danger
Hazard statements	H225, H315, H317, H319
Precautionary statements	P210, P233, P240, P241, P242, P243, P261, P264, P272, P280, P302+P352, P303+P361+P353, P305+P351+P338, P321, P332+P313, P333+P313, P337+P313, P362, P363, P370+P378, P403+P235, P501
- Except where otherwise noted, data are given for materials in their standard state (at 25 °C [77 °F], 100 kPa). verify (what is ?) Infobox references

3,4-Dihydropyran (DHP) is a heterocyclic compound with the formula C_{5}H_{8}O. The six-membered C_{5}O ring has the unsaturation adjacent to oxygen. The isomeric 3,6-dihydropyran has a methylene separating the double bond and oxygen. DHP is used for protecting group for alcohols. It is a colorless liquid.

== Preparation ==
Dihydropyran is prepared by the dehydration of tetrahydrofurfuryl alcohol over alumina at 300–400 °C. THFA is itself prepared from tetrahydro-2-furoic acid.

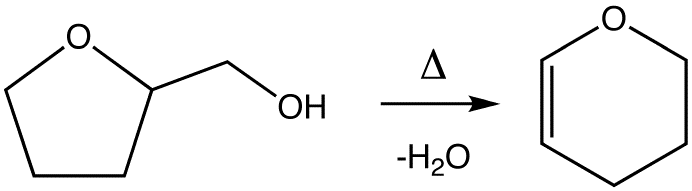

== Reactions ==
In organic synthesis, the 2-tetrahydropyranyl (THP) group is used as a protecting group for alcohols. Reaction of the alcohol with DHP forms a THP ether, protecting the alcohol from a variety of reactions. The alcohol can later be restored by acidic hydrolysis, concomitant with formation of 5-hydroxypentanal.

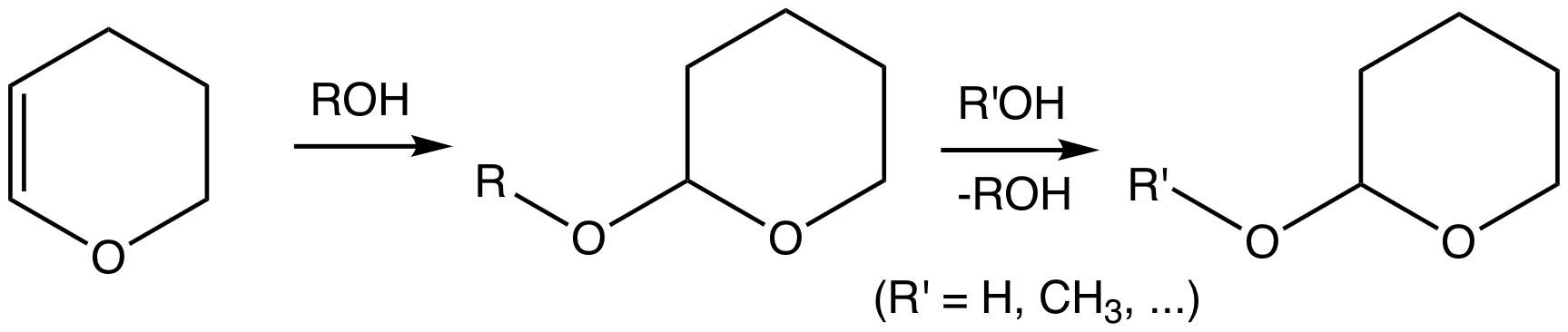
Protection of an alcohol as THP ether followed by its deprotection. Both steps require acid catalysts.

== See also ==
- Pyran
- Tetrahydropyran
