= Oxopentanoic acid =

Oxopentanoic acid may refer to:

- Levulinic acid (4-oxopentanoic acid)
- 3-Oxopentanoic acid
