= Dioxane (compounds) =

The three isomers of dioxane. Small numbers show numbering of atoms in rings.

Dioxane may refer to the following chemical compounds:

- 1,2-dioxane
- 1,3-dioxane
- 1,4-dioxane
