= Horner–Wadsworth–Emmons reaction =

Variation on the Wittig chemical reaction

Named after	Leopold Horner; William S. Wadsworth; William D. Emmons
Reaction type	Coupling reaction

Identifiers
Organic Chemistry Portal	wittig-horner-reaction
RSC ontology ID	RXNO:0000056

The Horner–Wadsworth–Emmons (HWE) reaction is a chemical reaction used in organic chemistry of stabilized phosphonate carbanions with aldehydes (or ketones) to produce predominantly E-alkenes.

The Horner–Wadsworth–Emmons reaction

In 1958, Leopold Horner published a modified Wittig reaction using phosphonate-stabilized carbanions. William S. Wadsworth and William D. Emmons further defined the reaction.

In contrast to phosphonium ylides used in the Wittig reaction, phosphonate-stabilized carbanions are more nucleophilic but less basic. Likewise, phosphonate-stabilized carbanions can be alkylated. Unlike phosphonium ylides, the dialkylphosphate salt byproduct is easily removed by aqueous extraction.

Several reviews have been published.

== Reaction mechanism ==
Deprotonation by base (B-) to generate the phosphonate carbanion

The Horner–Wadsworth–Emmons reaction begins with the deprotonation of the phosphonate to give the phosphonate carbanion 1. Nucleophilic addition of the carbanion onto the aldehyde 2 (or ketone) producing 3a or 3b is the rate-limiting step. If R^{2} = H, then intermediates 3a and 4a and intermediates 3b and 4b can interconvert with each other. The final elimination of oxaphosphetanes 4a and 4b yield (E)-alkene 5 and (Z)-alkene 6, with the by-product being a dialkyl-phosphate.

The mechanism of the Horner-Wadsworth-Emmons reaction

The ratio of alkene isomers 5 and 6 is not dependent upon the stereochemical outcome of the initial carbanion addition and upon the ability of the intermediates to equilibrate.

The electron-withdrawing group (EWG) alpha to the phosphonate is necessary for the final elimination to occur. In the absence of an electron-withdrawing group, the final product is the β-hydroxyphosphonate 3a and 3b. However, these β-hydroxyphosphonates can be transformed to alkenes by reaction with diisopropylcarbodiimide.

== Stereoselectivity ==
The Horner–Wadsworth–Emmons reaction favours the formation of (E)-alkenes. In general, the more equilibration amongst intermediates, the higher the selectivity for (E)-alkene formation.

=== Disubstituted alkenes ===
Thompson and Heathcock have performed a systematic study of the reaction of methyl 2-(dimethoxyphosphoryl)acetate with various aldehydes. While each effect was small, they had a cumulative effect making it possible to modify the stereochemical outcome without modifying the structure of the phosphonate. They found greater (E)-stereoselectivity with the following conditions:

- Increasing steric bulk of the aldehyde
- Higher reaction temperatures (23 °C over −78 °C)
- Li > Na > K salts

In a separate study, it was found that bulky phosphonate and bulky electron-withdrawing groups enhance E-alkene selectivity.

=== Trisubstituted alkenes ===
The steric bulk of the phosphonate and electron-withdrawing groups plays a critical role in the reaction of α-branched phosphonates with aliphatic aldehydes.

Example of the Horner–Wadsworth–Emmons reaction with branched phosphonates

R^{1}	R^{2}	Ratio of alkenes ( E : Z )
Methyl	Methyl	5 : 95
Methyl	Ethyl	10 : 90
Ethyl	Ethyl	40 : 60
Isopropyl	Ethyl	90 : 10
Isopropyl	Isopropyl	95 : 5

Aromatic aldehydes produce almost exclusively (E)-alkenes. In case (Z)-alkenes from aromatic aldehydes are needed, the Still–Gennari modification (see below) can be used.

=== Olefination of ketones ===
The stereoselectivity of the Horner–Wadsworth–Emmons reaction of ketones is poor to modest.

== Variations ==
=== Base sensitive substrates ===
Since many substrates are not stable to sodium hydride, several procedures have been developed using milder bases. Masamune and Roush have developed mild conditions using lithium chloride and DBU. Rathke extended this to lithium or magnesium halides with triethylamine. Several other bases have been found effective.

=== Gennari-Still modification ===
W. Clark Still and C. Gennari have developed conditions that give Z-alkenes with excellent stereoselectivity. Using phosphonates with electron-withdrawing groups (trifluoroethyl) together with strongly dissociating conditions (KHMDS and 18-crown-6 in THF) nearly exclusive Z-alkene production can be achieved.

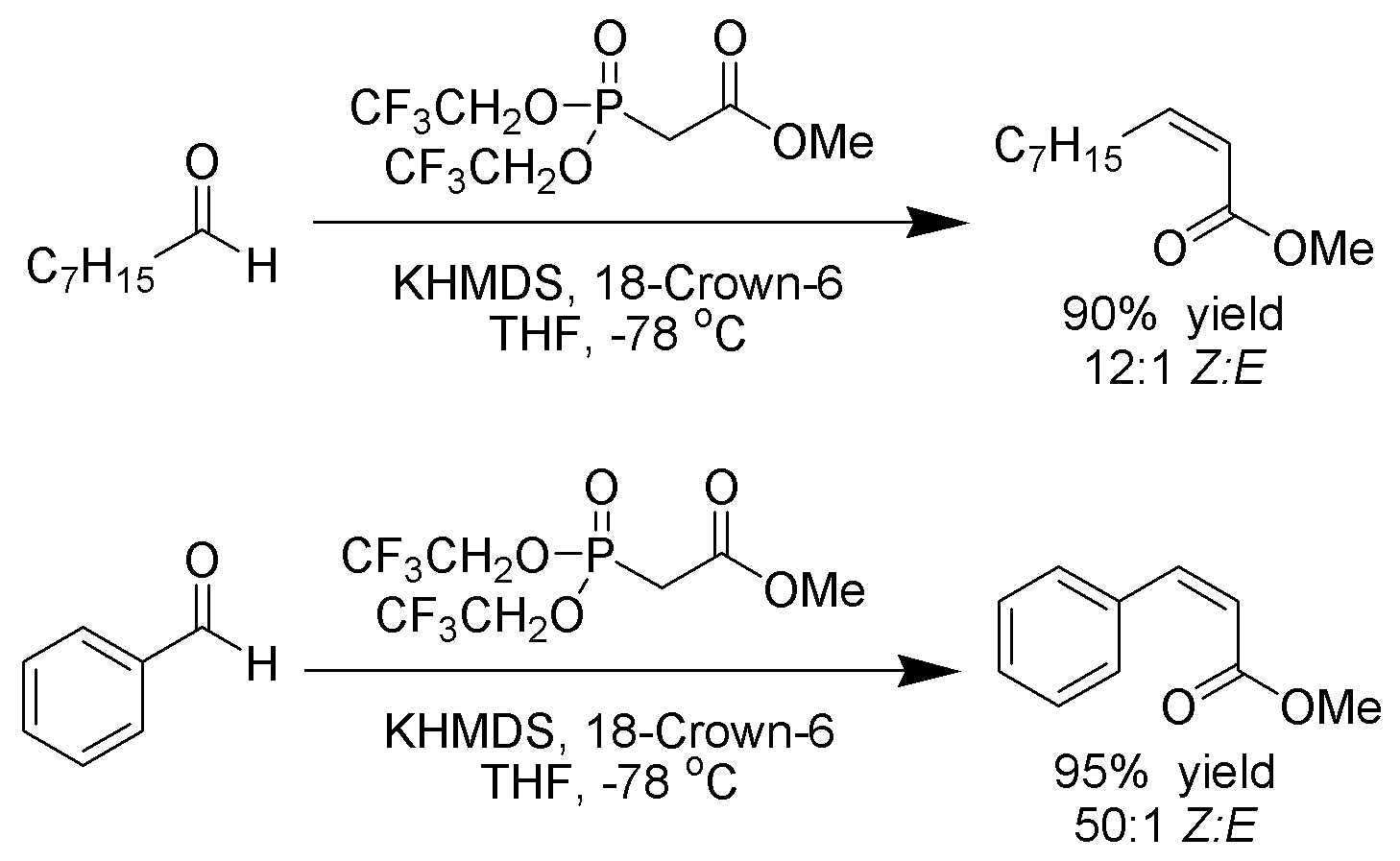
The Still modification of the Horner–Wadsworth–Emmons reaction

Ando has suggested that the use of electron-deficient phosphonates accelerates the elimination of the oxaphosphetane intermediates.

== See also ==
- Wittig reaction
- Michaelis–Arbuzov reaction
- Michaelis–Becker reaction
- Peterson reaction
- Tebbe olefination
