= William D. Emmons =

American chemist

- Born: November 18, 1924; Minnesota
- Died: December 8, 2001 (aged 77)
- Education: University of Minnesota
- Known for: Horner-Wadsworth-Emmons reaction
- Scientific career
- Workplaces: Rohm and Haas

William D. Emmons (November 18, 1924 – December 8, 2001) was an American chemist and published with William S. Wadsworth a modification to the Wittig-Horner reaction using phosphonate-stabilized carbanions, now called the Horner-Wadsworth-Emmons reaction in his honor.

== Life ==
Emmons, a native of Minnesota, studied at the University of MinnesotaB.Sc. degree. After serving in World War 2 as a meteorologist in the Pacific Theater, he attended graduate school at the University of Illinois, where he received a PhD. in 1951 (research advisor R. C. Fuson). He avoided being drafted for the Korean War by working for the Redstone Arsenal Research of Rohm and Haas. In 1986, his innovations were rewarded with the first Roy W. Tess Award for Coatings Science awarded by the Polymeric Materials, Science, and Engineering Division of the American Chemical Society (ACS). He retired from Rohm and Haas in 1989.

== Work ==
In work undertaken in collaboration with Arthur F. Ferris, Emmons reported that in situ generated trifluoroperacetic acid was capable of oxidising aniline to nitrobenzene, an observation which pioneered the applications of this peroxy acid as an oxidising agent in organic chemistry. Emmons went on to discuss the preparation of trifluoroperacetic acid and numerous applications of the new reagent, including: oxidation of nitrosamines to nitramines; the Baeyer–Villiger oxidations of ketones to esters; and the conversion of alkenes to epoxides (in the presence of a buffer) or to glycols (without the buffer). He was credited with several breakthrough innovations, and was the author of more than 150 patents and papers during his 38-year career according to Rohm and Haasand was also prompted development of new urethane rheology modifiers that contributed to significant advances in the performance of water-based acrylic paint and early research on a variety of opaque polymers, including Rohm and Haas's Hollow Sphere Polymer technology.
