= Leopold Horner =

German chemist (1911–2005)

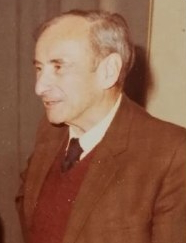
- Leopold Horner
- Born: 24 August 1911; Kehl, German Empire
- Died: 5 October 2005 (aged 94); Mainz, Germany
- Education: Ludwig-Maximilians-Universität München
- Known for: Asymmetric hydrogenation Horner–Wadsworth–Emmons reaction
- Awards: Liebig Medal (1973); Cothenius Medal (2001)
- Scientific career
- Workplaces: Ludwig-Maximilians-Universität München, University of Mainz
- Doctoral advisor: Heinrich Wieland

Leopold Horner (24 August 1911 – 5 October 2005) was a German chemist who published a modified Wittig reaction using phosphonate-stabilized carbanions now called the Horner–Wadsworth–Emmons reaction (HWE reaction) or Horner-Wittig reaction.

== Life ==
Horner started studying chemistry at Heidelberg University and later with Heinrich Wieland at the Ludwig-Maximilians-Universität München. After he received his Ph.D. and his habilitation he worked at the Polymer Research Institute in Frankfurt. In 1953, he became professor at the University of Mainz.
