= Tetrahydropyran =

Structural formula
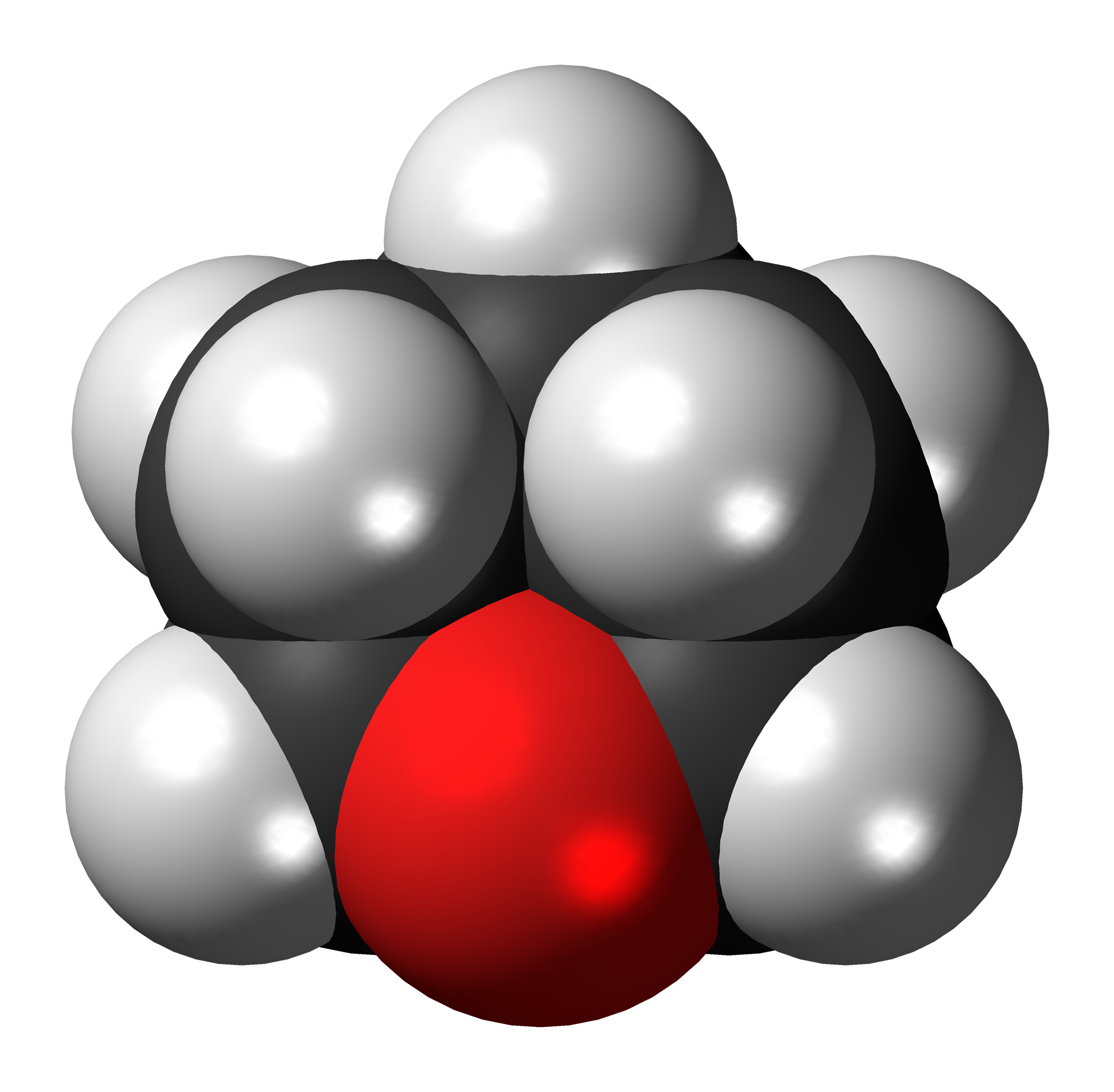
Space-filling model

Names
- Preferred IUPAC name Oxane
- Other names Tetrahydropyran, Oxacyclohexane, 1,5-epoxypentane

Identifiers
CAS Number	142-68-7
3D model (JSmol)	Interactive image
Beilstein Reference	102436
ChEBI	CHEBI:46941
ChemSpider	8554
DrugBank	DB02412
ECHA InfoCard	100.005.048
EC Number	205-552-8
PubChem CID	8894
UNII	V06I3ILG6B
CompTox Dashboard (EPA)	DTXSID3059719
- InChI: InChI=1S/C5H10O/c1-2-4-6-5-3-1/h1-5H2 Key: DHXVGJBLRPWPCS-UHFFFAOYSA-N; InChI=1/C5H10O/c1-2-4-6-5-3-1/h1-5H2 Key: DHXVGJBLRPWPCS-UHFFFAOYAV
- SMILES: O1CCCCC1

Properties
Chemical formula	C_{5}H_{10}O
Molar mass	86.134 g·mol^{−1}
Appearance	Colourless liquid
Density	0.880 g/cm^{3}
Melting point	−45 °C (−49 °F; 228 K)
Boiling point	88 °C (190 °F; 361 K)

Hazards
- Occupational safety and health (OHS/OSH)
Main hazards	Flammable, Causes skin irritation
NFPA 704 (fire diamond)	2 4 1
Flash point	−15.6 °C (3.9 °F; 257.5 K)
- Lethal dose or concentration (LD, LC)
LD_{Lo} (lowest published)	3000 mg/kg (oral, rat)
- Except where otherwise noted, data are given for materials in their standard state (at 25 °C [77 °F], 100 kPa). verify (what is ?) Infobox references

Tetrahydropyran (THP) is the organic compound consisting of a saturated six-membered ring containing five carbon atoms and one oxygen atom. It is named by reference to pyran, which contains two double bonds, and may be produced from it by adding four hydrogens. In 2013, its preferred IUPAC name was established as oxane. The compound is a colourless volatile liquid. Derivatives of tetrahydropyran are, however, more common. 2-Tetrahydropyranyl (THP-) ethers derived from the reaction of alcohols and 3,4-dihydropyran are commonly used as protecting groups in organic synthesis. Furthermore, a tetrahydropyran ring system, i.e., five carbon atoms and an oxygen, is the core of pyranose sugars, such as glucose.

== Structure and preparation ==
In gas phase, the THP exists in its lowest energy C_{s} symmetry chair conformation.

One classic procedure for the organic synthesis of tetrahydropyran is by hydrogenation of the 3,4-isomer of dihydropyran with Raney nickel.

== Tetrahydropyranyl derivatives ==
Although tetrahydropyran is an obscure compound, tetrahydropyranyl ethers are commonly used in organic synthesis. Specifically, the 2-tetrahydropyranyl (THP) group is a common protecting group for alcohols. Alcohols react with 3,4-dihydropyran to give 2-tetrahydropyranyl ethers. These ethers are resilient to a variety of reactions. The alcohol can later be restored by acid-catalyzed hydrolysis. This hydrolysis reforms the parent alcohol as well as 5-hydroxypentanal. THP ethers derived from chiral alcohols form diastereomers. Another undesirable feature is that the ethers display complex NMR spectra, which interfere with analysis.

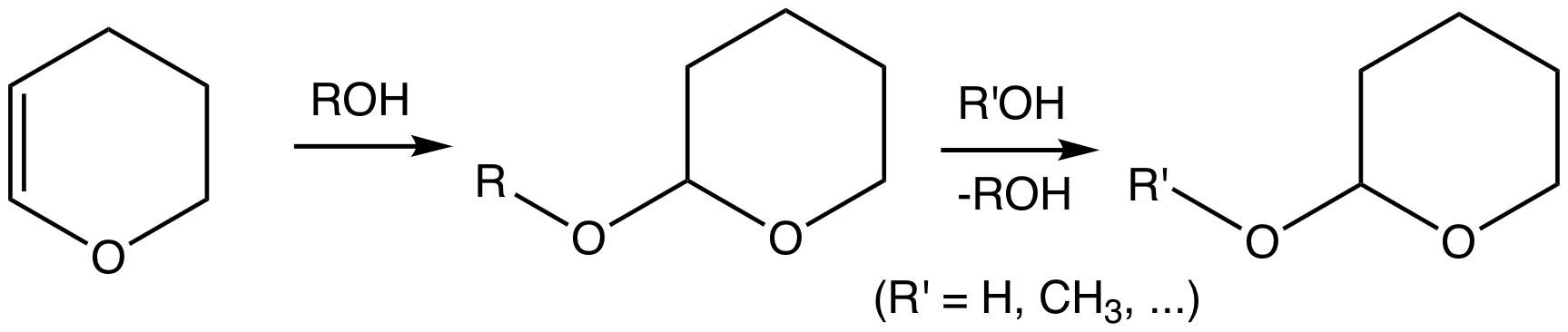
Protection of alcohol as THP ether followed by deprotection. Both steps require acid catalysts.

In a typical procedure, the alcohol is treated with 3,4-dihydropyran and p-toluenesulfonic acid in dichloromethane at ambient temperature.

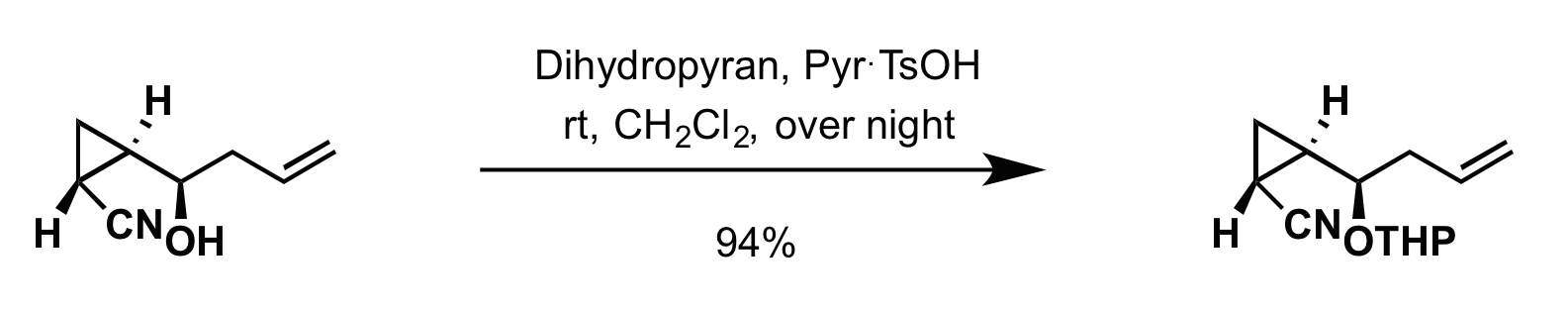
THP protection used in the total synthesis of solandelactone E

Alternatively, the THP ether can be generated under the conditions akin to those for the Mitsunobu reaction. Thus the alcohol is treated with 2-hydroxytetrahydropyranyl, triphenylphosphine, and diethyl azodicarboxylate (DEAD) in tetrahydrofuran (THF).

Commonly, THP ethers are deprotected using acetic acid in a THF/water solution, p-toluenesulfonic acid in water, or pyridinium p-toluenesulfonate (PPTS) in ethanol.

== Oxanes ==
Oxanes are the class of hexic cyclic ether rings with tetrahydropyran as the root chemical. Oxanes have one or more carbon atoms replaced with an oxygen atom. The IUPAC preferred name for tetrahydropyran is now oxane.

Oxane is also the brand name for cis-2-methyl-4-propyl-1,3-oxathiane, a commercial fragrance.

== See also ==
- Pyran
- Dioxane and Trioxane, which have two and three oxygen atoms as part of their six-membered rings respectively
