= 9-Crown-3 =

Names
- Preferred IUPAC name 1,4,7-Trioxonane
- Other names 1,4,7-Trioxacyclononane; Ethylene oxide trimer

Identifiers
CAS Number	27725-91-3
3D model (JSmol)	Interactive image
Beilstein Reference	1421638
ChEBI	CHEBI:32400
ChemSpider	480221
PubChem CID	552016
CompTox Dashboard (EPA)	DTXSID70338923
- InChI: InChI=1S/C6H12O3/c1-2-8-5-6-9-4-3-7-1/h1-6H2 Key: RCIDBLLMZGGECJ-UHFFFAOYSA-N
- SMILES: C1COCCOCCO1

Properties
Chemical formula	C_{6}H_{12}O_{3}
Molar mass	132.159 g·mol^{−1}
Appearance	Colorless liquid
Melting point	0 °C (32 °F; 273 K)
- Except where otherwise noted, data are given for materials in their standard state (at 25 °C [77 °F], 100 kPa). Infobox references

9-Crown-3, also called 1,4,7-trioxonane or 1,4,7-trioxacyclononane, is a crown ether with the formula (C_{2}H_{4}O)_{3}. A colorless liquid, it is obtained in low yield by the acid-catalyzed oligomerization of ethylene oxide.

In contrast to larger crown ethers (12-crown-4, and 18-crown-6), 9-crown-3 has elicited very little interest, except from theorists.

== See also ==
- 1,4-Dioxane
