= 1,4-Dioxane =

Chemical structure of dioxane
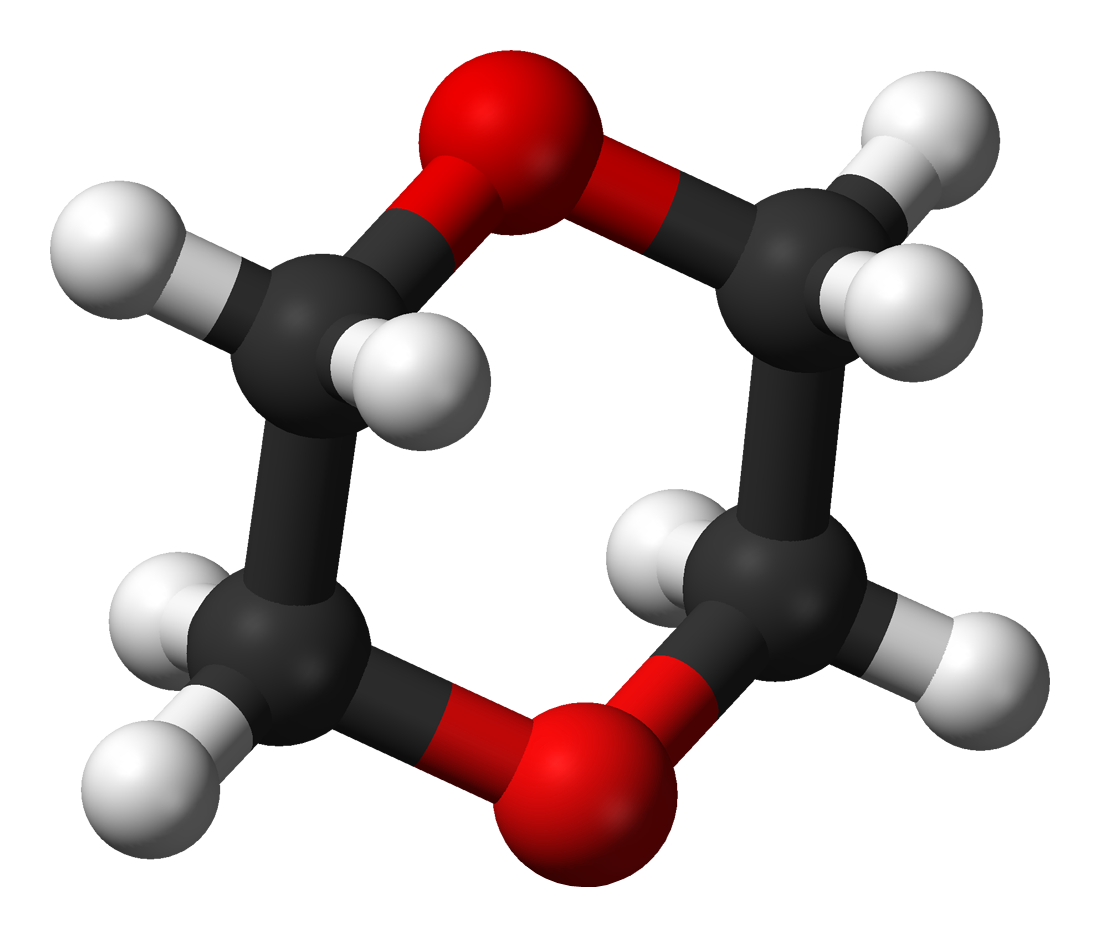
1,4-dioxane
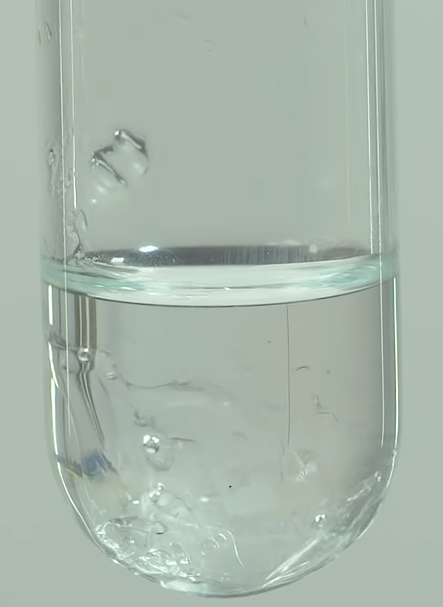

Names
- Preferred IUPAC name 1,4-Dioxane
- Systematic IUPAC name 1,4-Dioxacyclohexane
- Other names [1,4]Dioxane p-Dioxane [6]-crown-2 Diethylene dioxide Diethylene ether Dioxane solvent

Identifiers
CAS Number	123-91-1
3D model (JSmol)	Interactive image
Beilstein Reference	102551
ChEBI	CHEBI:47032
ChEMBL	ChEMBL453716
ChemSpider	29015
DrugBank	DB03316
ECHA InfoCard	100.004.239
EC Number	204-661-8
KEGG	C14440
PubChem CID	31275
RTECS number	JG8225000
UNII	J8A3S10O7S
UN number	1165
CompTox Dashboard (EPA)	DTXSID4020533
- InChI: InChI=1S/C4H8O2/c1-2-6-4-3-5-1/h1-4H2 Key: RYHBNJHYFVUHQT-UHFFFAOYSA-N; InChI=1/C4H8O2/c1-2-6-4-3-5-1/h1-4H2 Key: RYHBNJHYFVUHQT-UHFFFAOYAN
- SMILES: O1CCOCC1

Properties
Chemical formula	C_{4}H_{8}O_{2}
Molar mass	88.106 g·mol^{−1}
Appearance	Colorless liquid
Odor	Mild, diethyl ether-like
Density	1.033 g/mL
Melting point	11.8 °C (53.2 °F; 284.9 K)
Boiling point	101.1 °C (214.0 °F; 374.2 K)
Solubility in water	Miscible
Vapor pressure	29 mmHg (20 °C)
Magnetic susceptibility (χ)	−52.16·10^{−6} cm^{3}/mol

Thermochemistry
Std molar entropy (S^{⦵}_{298})	196.6 J/K·mol
Std enthalpy of formation (Δ_{f}H^{⦵}_{298})	−354 kJ/mol
Std enthalpy of combustion (Δ_{c}H^{⦵}_{298})	−2363 kJ/mol

Hazards
- Occupational safety and health (OHS/OSH)
Main hazards	Suspected human carcinogen
- GHS labelling
Pictograms	(GHS02: Flammable) (GHS07: Exclamation mark) (GHS08: Health hazard)
Signal word	Danger
Hazard statements	H225, H302, H305, H315, H319, H332, H336, H351, H370, H372, H373
Precautionary statements	P201, P202, P210, P233, P240, P241, P242, P243, P260, P264, P270, P271, P280, P281, P302+P352, P303+P361+P353, P304+P312, P304+P340, P305+P351+P338, P307+P311, P308+P313, P312, P314, P321, P332+P313, P337+P313, P362, P370+P378, P403+P233, P403+P235, P405, P501
NFPA 704 (fire diamond)	2 3 1
Flash point	12 °C (54 °F; 285 K)
Autoignition temperature	180 °C (356 °F; 453 K)
Explosive limits	2.0–22%
- Lethal dose or concentration (LD, LC)
LD_{50} (median dose)	5 g/kg (mouse, oral); 4 g/kg (rat, oral); 3 g/kg (guinea pig, oral); 7.6 g/kg (rabbit, dermal)
LC_{50} (median concentration)	10,109 ppm (mouse, 2 hr); 12,568 ppm (rat, 2 hr)
LC_{Lo} (lowest published)	1000–3000 ppm (guinea pig, 3 hr) 12,022 ppm (cat, 7 hr); 2085 ppm (mouse, 8 hr)
- NIOSH (US health exposure limits)
PEL (Permissible)	TWA 100 ppm (360 mg/m^{3}) [skin]
REL (Recommended)	Ca C 1 ppm (3.6 mg/m^{3}) [30-minute]
IDLH (Immediate danger)	Ca [500 ppm]

Related compounds
Related compounds	Oxane; Trioxane
- Except where otherwise noted, data are given for materials in their standard state (at 25 °C [77 °F], 100 kPa). verify (what is ?) Infobox references

1,4-Dioxane (/daɪˈɒkseɪn/) is a heterocyclic organic compound, classified as an ether. It is a colorless liquid with a faint sweet odor similar to that of diethyl ether. The compound is often called simply dioxane because the other dioxane isomers (1,2- and 1,3-) are rarely encountered.

1,4-Dioxane is miscible in water, essentially nonvolatile when dissolved in water, not well adsorbed by activated carbon, and not readily oxidized by common oxidants.

Dioxane is used as a solvent in manufacturing applications, and as a stabilizer for the transport of chlorinated hydrocarbons in aluminium containers. It is a highly flammable substance that produces toxic vapors when heated.

Although it is a trace material in commonly used products, such as cosmetics, dioxane is considered a hazardous contaminant and potential carcinogen in many countries, requiring government monitoring of amounts used in manufacturing and its presence in air, drinking water, and ecosystems.

== History and synthesis ==
The compound was discovered by Portuguese professor Agostinho Vicente Lourenço in 1860 by a reaction of ethylene glycol with 1,2-dibromoethane. He initially designated it ether of glycol and correctly identified its empirical formula, but measured its boiling point at about 95 °C. Three years later C. A. Wurtz obtained it by another method, called it dioxyethylene and studied some of its chemical properties.

Dioxane is industrially produced since the 1920s by the acid-catalysed dehydration of diethylene glycol, which in turn is obtained from the hydrolysis of ethylene oxide. This method was developed by Alexey Favorsky in 1906, who also determined the structure of the compound.

In 1985, the global production capacity for dioxane was between 11,000 and 14,000 tons. In 1990, the total U.S. production volume of dioxane was between 5,250 and 9,150 tons.

== Structure ==
The three isomers of dioxane

Three isomers of dioxane exist, but only the 1,3- and 1,4- isomers are significant. The 1,4-dioxane molecule is conformationally flexible: the centrosymmetric chair and the boat conformations easily interconvert such that the H NMR spectrum shows only one signal. For this reason, it is sometimes used as an internal standard for nuclear magnetic resonance spectroscopy in deuterium oxide. With only two ethyleneoxyl units, dioxane is one of the smallest crown ethers.

== Uses ==
=== Trichloroethane transport ===
In the 1980s, most of the dioxane produced was used as a stabilizer for 1,1,1-trichloroethane for storage and transport in aluminium containers. Normally aluminium is protected by a passivating oxide layer, but when these layers are disturbed, the metallic aluminium reacts with trichloroethane to give aluminium trichloride, which in turn catalyses the dehydrohalogenation of the remaining trichloroethane to vinylidene chloride and hydrogen chloride. Dioxane "poisons" this catalysis reaction by forming an adduct with aluminium trichloride.

=== As a solvent ===
Binary phase diagram for the system 1,4-dioxane/water

Dioxane is used in a variety of applications as a versatile aprotic solvent (usually considered non-polar, although some sources state otherwise), e.g. for inks, adhesives, and cellulose esters. It is substituted for tetrahydrofuran (THF) in some processes, because of its lower toxicity and higher boiling point (101 °C, versus 66 °C for THF).

While diethyl ether is rather insoluble in water, dioxane is miscible and in fact is hygroscopic. At standard pressure, the mixture of water and dioxane in the ratio 17.9:82.1 by mass is a positive azeotrope that boils at 87.6 °C.

The oxygen atoms are weakly Lewis-basic. It forms adducts with a variety of Lewis acids. It is classified as a hard base and its base parameters in the ECW model are E_{B} = 1.86 and C_{B} = 1.29.

Dioxane produces insoluble coordination polymers by linking metal centers. In this way, it is used to drive the Schlenk equilibrium, allowing the synthesis of dialkyl magnesium compounds. Dimethylmagnesium is prepared in this manner:

2 CH_{3}MgBr + (C_{2}H_{4}O)_{2} → MgBr_{2}(C_{2}H_{4}O)_{2} + (CH_{3})_{2}Mg

== Toxicology ==
=== Safety ===
Dioxane vapor is irritating to the eyes and respiratory tract; its contamination of air, food, drinking water, or cosmetics are examples of typical exposure. High levels of 1,4-dioxane in the air can result in injury to the nasal cavity, liver, or kidneys.

As a flammable compound, dioxane under high heat or fire may produce irritating, corrosive and toxic vapors causing dizziness or asphyxiation in confined work spaces. Environmental contamination, especially in drinking water, may occur from manufacturing runoff or uncontrolled waste disposal.

Dioxane is classified by several government agencies as a potential cancer-causing chemical. It is also classified by the IARC as a Group 2B carcinogen: possibly carcinogenic to humans because it is a known carcinogen in other animals. In 2024, the United States Environmental Protection Agency classified dioxane as a probable human carcinogen and an unreasonable risk to human health, which establishes a legal basis for federal regulation under the Toxic Substances Control Act. The State of New York has adopted a first-in-the-nation drinking water standard for 1,4-dioxane and set the maximum contaminant level of 1 part per billion.

=== Explosion hazard ===
Like some other ethers, dioxane combines with atmospheric oxygen upon prolonged exposure to air to form potentially explosive peroxides. Distillation of these mixtures is dangerous. Storage over metallic sodium could limit the risk of peroxide accumulation.

=== Environment ===
Dioxane biodegrades through a number of pathways.

Dioxane has affected groundwater supplies in several areas. Dioxane at the level of 1 μg/L (~1 ppb) has been detected in many locations in the US. In the U.S. state of New Hampshire, it was found at 67 sites in 2010, ranging in concentration from 2 ppb to over 11,000 ppb. Thirty of these sites are solid waste landfills, most of which have been closed for years. In 2019, the Southern Environmental Law Center successfully sued Greensboro, North Carolina's Wastewater treatment after 1,4-Dioxane was found at 20 times above EPA safe levels in the Haw River.

Municipalities, industrial water users and superfund sites are successfully removing dioxane from water streams with advanced oxidation process systems.

=== Consumer products ===
As a byproduct of the ethoxylation process, a route to some ingredients found in cleansing and moisturizing products, traces of dioxane can be found in cosmetics and personal care products, such as deodorants, perfumes, shampoos, toothpastes, and mouthwashes. The ethoxylation process makes the cleansing agents, such as sodium laureth sulfate and ammonium laureth sulfate, less abrasive and offers enhanced foaming characteristics. Dioxane is found in small amounts in some cosmetics.

Since 1979, the U.S. Food and Drug Administration conducted tests on cosmetic raw materials and finished products for the levels of 1,4-dioxane. 1,4-Dioxane was present in ethoxylated raw ingredients at levels up to 1410 ppm (~0.14%wt), and at levels up to 279 ppm (~0.03%wt) in off the shelf cosmetic products. Levels of 1,4-dioxane exceeding 85 ppm (~0.01%wt) in children's shampoos indicate that close monitoring of raw materials and finished products is warranted. Since the presence of 1,4-dioxane was recognized, many manufacturers have implemented purification processes, such as vacuum and steam stripping, to reduce its concentration in finished products. While the FDA encourages manufacturers to remove 1,4-dioxane, it is not required by federal law.

On 9 December 2019, the State of New York amended Environmental Conservation Law (ECL) to regulate 1,4-dioxane in consumer products. The law restricts 1,4-dioxane concentrations in household cleansing and personal care products to a maximum of 2 ppm starting 31 December 2022, and a stricter limit of 1 ppm beginning 31 December 2023. Cosmetic products face a maximum allowable concentration of 10 ppm of 1,4-dioxane as of 31 December 2022.

== See also ==
- Dioxolane
- 9-Crown-3
