= Trans-2,3-Butylene carbonate =

trans-2,3-Butylene carbonate
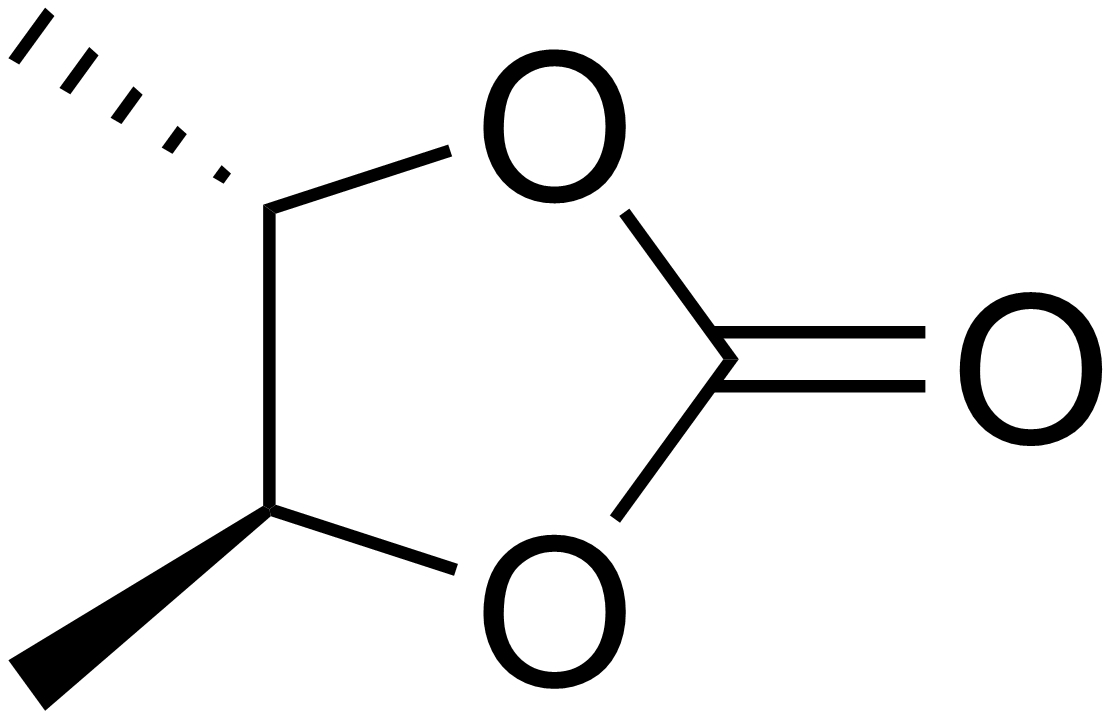

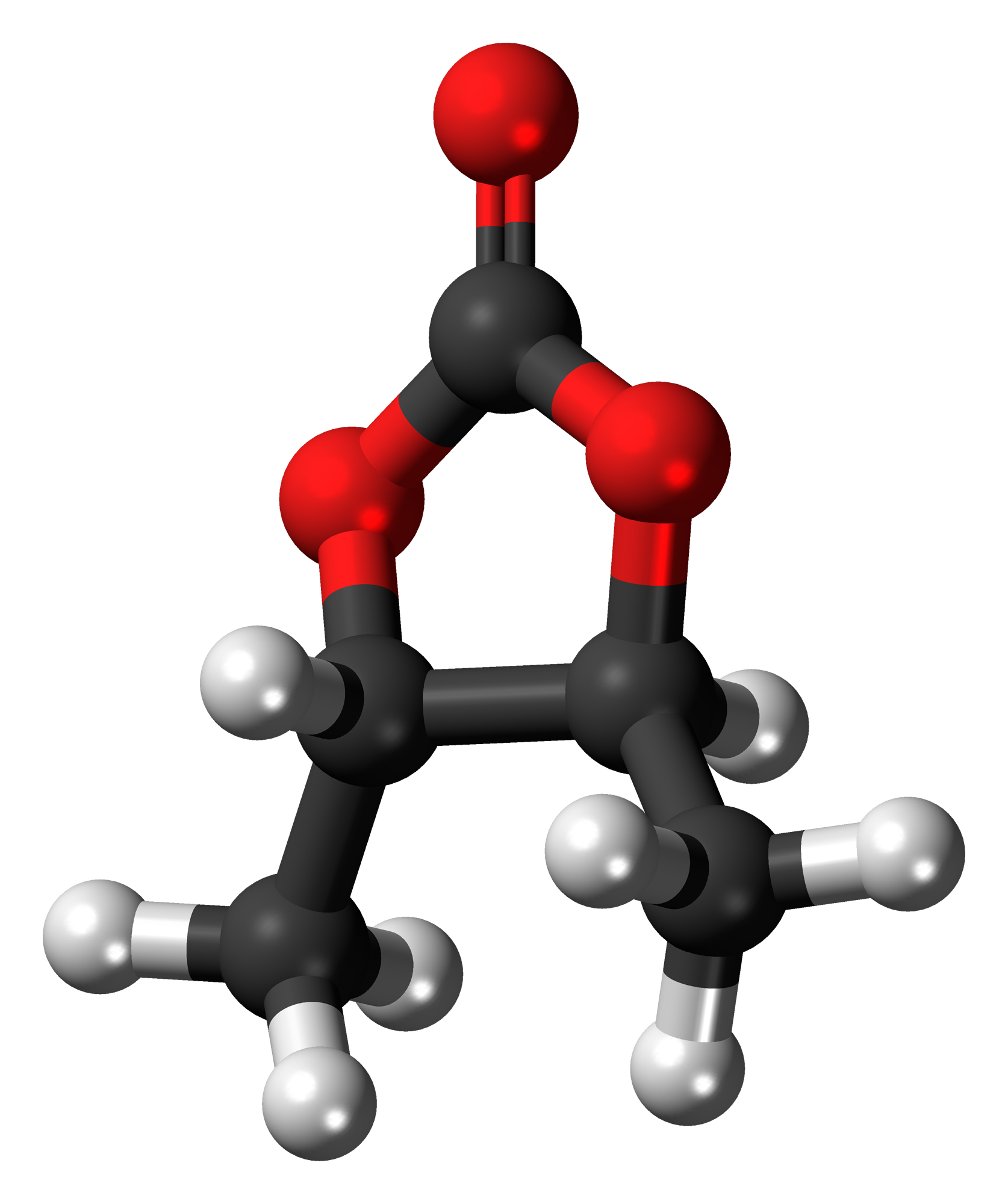

Names
- IUPAC name trans-4,5-Dimethyl-[1,3]dioxolan-2-one

Identifiers
CAS Number	65941-76-6; 51260-48-1 (R,R); 51261-82-6 (S,S)
3D model (JSmol)	Interactive image; Interactive image
ChemSpider	8255915
PubChem CID	10080377
UNII	V4U69J5MK2
CompTox Dashboard (EPA)	DTXSID10435208
- InChI: InChI=1S/C5H8O3/c1-3-4(2)8-5(6)7-3/h3-4H,1-2H3/t3-,4-/m0/s1 Key: LWLOKSXSAUHTJO-IMJSIDKUSA-N; InChI=1/C5H8O3/c1-3-4(2)8-5(6)7-3/h3-4H,1-2H3/t3-,4-/m0/s1 Key: LWLOKSXSAUHTJO-IMJSIDKUBM
- SMILES: O=C1O[C@@H](C)[C@@H](O1)C; O=C1O[C@@H](C)[C@H](C)O1

Properties
Chemical formula	C_{5}H_{8}O_{3}
Molar mass	116.116 g·mol^{−1}
- Except where otherwise noted, data are given for materials in their standard state (at 25 °C [77 °F], 100 kPa). verify (what is ?) Infobox references

trans-2,3-Butylene carbonate is an organic compound with formula C_{5}H_{8}O_{3}, or (H_{3}C)_{2}(C_{2}H_{2})(CO_{3}). It is an ester with a carbonate functional group bonded to both free ends of the trans-2,3-butylene group. It is also a heterocyclic compound with a five-membered ring containing two oxygen atoms, and can be viewed as a derivative of dioxolane, namely trans-4,5-dimethyl-1,3-dioxolan-2-one.

The compound is an aprotic polar solvent and has been proposed as an ingredient of the electrolyte of lithium batteries.

== See also ==
- cis-2,3-Butylene carbonate, a stereoisomer
- 1,2-Butylene carbonate
- Propylene carbonate
