= 3-Hydroxytetrahydrofuran =

Names
- Preferred IUPAC name Oxolan-3-ol
- Other names Tetrahydrofuran-3-ol; Tetrahydro-3-furanol; 3-OH THF

Identifiers
CAS Number	453-20-3
3D model (JSmol)	Interactive image
ChemSpider	9566
ECHA InfoCard	100.006.564
PubChem CID	9960
UNII	4MA8Z6Y28L
CompTox Dashboard (EPA)	DTXSID20868947
- InChI: InChI=1S/C4H8O2/c5-4-1-2-6-3-4/h4-5H,1-3H2 Key: XDPCNPCKDGQBAN-UHFFFAOYSA-N; InChI=1/C4H8O2/c5-4-1-2-6-3-4/h4-5H,1-3H2 Key: XDPCNPCKDGQBAN-UHFFFAOYAL
- SMILES: OC1CCOC1

Properties
Chemical formula	C_{4}H_{8}O_{2}
Molar mass	88.106 g·mol^{−1}
Density	1.087 g/cm^{3} @19 °C
Boiling point	179 °C (354 °F; 452 K) (88−89 °C @17 mm Hg)
- Except where otherwise noted, data are given for materials in their standard state (at 25 °C [77 °F], 100 kPa). Infobox references

3-Hydroxytetrahydrofuran (3-OH THF) is a colorless liquid with a normal boiling point of 179 °C and boiling at 88−89 °C at 17 mmHg, with density (1.087 g/cm^{3} at 19 °C). 3-OH THF is a useful pharmaceutical intermediate. The enantiopure (absolute configuration S) version of this compound is an intermediate to launched retroviral drugs.

== Synthesis ==
3-Hydroxytetrahydrofuran was prepared in 1909 by Pariselle via cyclization and hydrolysis of 3,4-Dibromo-1-methoxybutane. Chiral 3-hydroxytetrahydrofuran (both (S) – and (R)-forms) has been synthesized in high enantiomeric purity from (S)- and (R)-1,2,4-butanetriol, respectively, obtained from chiral feedstocks. Thus, the chiral (S)-1,2,4-butanetriol intermediate was cyclized to chiral (S)-3-hydroxytetrahydrofuran in the presence of p-toluenesulfonic acid (PTSA) catalyst at temperatures of 180−220 °C. Similarly, (S)-3-hydroxytetrahydrofuran was prepared in 95.8% optical purity from L-malic acid via an esterification-reduction-cyclodehydration sequence. 3-hydroxytetrahydrofuran has been synthesized via hydroboration of 2,3- and 2,5-dihydrofuran employing various borane reagents and chiral 3-hydroxytetrahydrofurans have also been prepared by catalytic asymmetric hydroboration of 2,3- and 2,5-dihydrofurans with a borane in the presence of a homogeneous chiral platinum complex, followed by oxidation. Racemic 3-hydroxytetrahydrofuran may be prepared in analogous fashion from racemic butanetriol, employing PTSA catalyst for the dehydrocyclization. Alternatively, 1,2,4-butanetriol may be converted to 3-hydroxytetrahydrofuran by treating with ethylene carbonate, followed by pyrolysis of the resulting carbonate ester.

== Applications ==
3-Hydroxytetrahydrofuran is an intermediate to the AIDS drugs amprenavir and fosamprenavir. Additionally, 3-OH THF has been an intermediate to developmental drug substances, such as chemotherapy agents. For example, reaction of phosphorus pentasulfide with 3-hydroxytetrahydrofuran has been used in the synthesis of bis(O,O-di(tetrahydrofuran-3-yl)hydrogen dithiophosphate)platinum(II), a cisplatin analog. 3-hydroxytetrahydrofuran may be converted into a range of tetrahydrofuran derivatives, many of which also serve as intermediates to compounds of pharmaceutical interest. For example, tetrahydrofuran-3-one (3-ketotetrahydrofuran) and 3-aminotetrahydrofuran have been synthesized from 3-hydroxytetrahydrofuran and used in pharmaceutical syntheses. Additionally, additive amounts (0.05-0.15 weight %) of the nitrate ester manufactured by sulfuric acid-nitric acid nitration of 3-hydoxytetrahydrofuran have been found to increase the quality (cetane number) of diesel fuel.
