= Cis-2,3-Butylene carbonate =

cis-2,3-Butylene carbonate
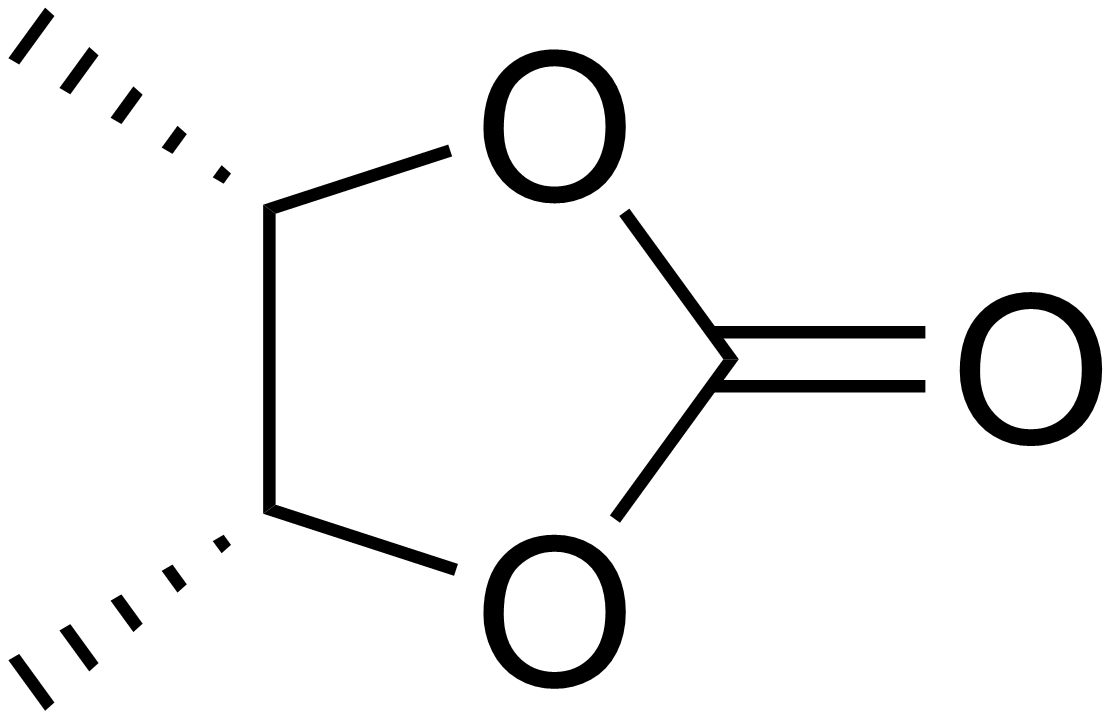

Names
- Preferred IUPAC name (4R,5S)-4,5-Dimethyl-1,3-dioxolan-2-one
- Other names cis-4,5-Dimethyl-1,3-dioxolan-2-one

Identifiers
CAS Number	36368-39-5
3D model (JSmol)	Interactive image; Interactive image
ChemSpider	9609796
PubChem CID	11434932
UNII	5QH9AX4WRJ
CompTox Dashboard (EPA)	DTXSID20465672
- InChI: InChI=1S/C5H8O3/c1-3-4(2)8-5(6)7-3/h3-4H,1-2H3/t3-,4+ Key: LWLOKSXSAUHTJO-ZXZARUISSA-N; InChI=1/C5H8O3/c1-3-4(2)8-5(6)7-3/h3-4H,1-2H3/t3-,4+ Key: LWLOKSXSAUHTJO-ZXZARUISBW
- SMILES: O=C1O[C@@H](C)[C@H](O1)C; O=C1O[C@@H](C)[C@@H](C)O1

Properties
Chemical formula	C_{5}H_{8}O_{3}
Molar mass	116.116 g·mol^{−1}
- Except where otherwise noted, data are given for materials in their standard state (at 25 °C [77 °F], 100 kPa). verify (what is ?) Infobox references

cis-2,3-Butylene carbonate is an organic compound with formula C_{5}H_{8}O_{3}, or (H_{3}C)_{2}(C_{2}H_{2})(CO_{3}). It is an ester with a carbonate functional group bonded to both free ends of the cis-2,3-butylene group. It is also a heterocyclic compound with a five-membered ring containing two oxygen atoms, and can be viewed as a derivative of dioxolane, namely cis-4,5-dimethyl-1,3-dioxolan-2-one.

The compound is an aprotic polar solvent.

The bacterium Pseudomonas diminuta will hydrolyze this compound but not its stereoisomer trans-2,3-Butylene carbonate, yielding cis-2,3-butanediol. This has been proposed as an efficient route to produce the latter from a racemic mixture of 2,3-butylene carbonates.

== See also ==
- trans-2,3-Butylene carbonate, a stereoisomer
- 1,2-Butylene carbonate
- Propylene carbonate
