= Isopropyl formate =

Organic chemical compound

Names
- Other names: Isopropyl methanoate

Identifiers
CAS Number	625-55-8
3D model (JSmol)	Interactive image
ChEBI	CHEBI:173325
ChEMBL	ChEMBL3184082
ChemSpider	11755
ECHA InfoCard	100.009.911
EC Number	210-901-2
PubChem CID	12257
UNII	H1L164W42G
CompTox Dashboard (EPA)	DTXSID2027258
- InChI: InChI=1S/C4H8O2/c1-4(2)6-3-5/h3-4H,1-2H3 Key: RMOUBSOVHSONPZ-UHFFFAOYSA-N
- SMILES: CC(C)OC=O

Properties
Chemical formula	C_{4}H_{8}O_{2}
Molar mass	88.106 g·mol^{−1}
Density	0.88g/cm^{3}
Boiling point	68 °C (154 °F; 341 K)
Refractive index (n_{D})	1.37

Hazards
- GHS labelling
Pictograms	(GHS02: Flammable) (GHS07: Exclamation mark)
Signal word	Danger
Hazard statements	H225, H319, H335, H336
Precautionary statements	P210, P233, P240, P241, P242, P243, P261, P264+P265, P271, P280, P303+P361+P353, P304+P340, P305+P351+P338, P319, P337+P317, P370+P378, P403+P233, P403+P235, P405, P501

Related compounds
Related compounds	Isopropyl acetate; 2-Methoxypropane; Methyl isopropyl ketone; Isobutyraldehyde
- Except where otherwise noted, data are given for materials in their standard state (at 25 °C [77 °F], 100 kPa). Infobox references

Isopropyl formate is an organic chemical compound. Like many other aliphatic carboxylic acid esters, it has a pleasant odor. It is described as pleasant and fruit-like, similar to plums or pears. In fact, many fruits contain isopropyl formate, but their smell is determined by a combination of esters, not by isopropyl formate alone.

== Production ==
Isopropyl formate can be produced by a typical Fischer Esterification, of isopropyl alcohol and formic acid, catalyzed by sulfuric acid:

HCOOH + (CH_{3})_{2}CHOH → C_{4}H_{8}O_{2} + H_{2}O

== Use ==
Isopropyl formate can be used as a flavour.

== Fate ==
When released in the atmosphere, isopropyl formate is mostly degraded by reaction with hydroxyl radicals and secondarily by chlorine atoms.
