= Steam stripping =

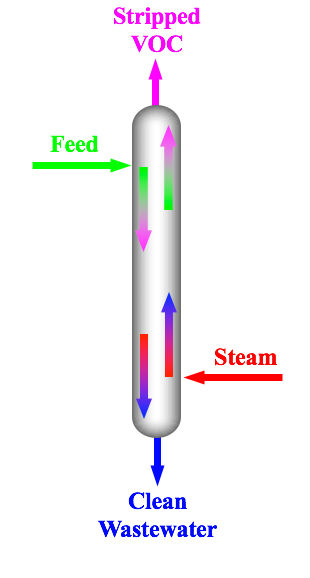
Diagram of how to economically clean up plant wastewater streams. Steam is use as a stripping gas to remove hydrocarbons from the waste water.

Steam stripping is a process used in petroleum refineries and petrochemical plants to remove volatile contaminants, such as hydrocarbons and other volatile organic compounds (VOCs), from wastewater. It typically consists of passing a stream of superheated steam through the wastewater.

This method is effective when the volatile compounds have lower boiling points than water or have limited solubility in water.
