= 1,2-Dioxane =

Names
- Preferred IUPAC name 1,2-Dioxane
- Other names o-Dioxane

Identifiers
CAS Number	5703-46-8
3D model (JSmol)	Interactive image
ChEBI	CHEBI:48426
ChemSpider	122188
PubChem CID	138570
UNII	DK6UQU3A2W
CompTox Dashboard (EPA)	DTXSID50205644
- InChI: InChI=1S/C4H8O2/c1-2-4-6-5-3-1/h1-4H2 Key: OIXUJRCCNNHWFI-UHFFFAOYSA-N
- SMILES: C1CCOOC1

Properties
Chemical formula	C_{4}H_{8}O_{2}
Molar mass	88.106 g·mol^{−1}
Appearance	colorless liquid
Boiling point	116–117 °C (241–243 °F; 389–390 K)
- Except where otherwise noted, data are given for materials in their standard state (at 25 °C [77 °F], 100 kPa). Infobox references

1,2-Dioxane or o-dioxane is an organic compound with the molecular formula (CH_{2})_{4}O_{2}, classified as a cyclic peroxide. Its synthesis was reported in 1956 by Criegee and Müller, who prepared it by reacting butane-1,4-diol bis(methanesulfonate) with hydrogen peroxide and distilled it as a colorless liquid. Acids and bases decompose it to gamma-hydroxybutyraldehyde.

Substituted 1,2-dioxanes have also been prepared, and some have been isolated from natural sources.

== See also ==
- 1,3-Dioxane
- 1,4-Dioxane
