= Α-Ketovaleric acid =

α-Ketovaleric acid

Names
- Preferred IUPAC name 2-Oxopentanoic acid
- Other names: α-Ketovalerate; α-Oxovaleric acid; 2-Ketopentanoic acid; 2-Oxo-n-valeric acid

Identifiers
CAS Number	1821-02-9
3D model (JSmol)	Interactive image
ChEBI	CHEBI:33033
ChEMBL	ChEMBL1162544
ChemSpider	67142
ECHA InfoCard	100.015.764
PubChem CID	74563
UNII	01I0OE93A7
CompTox Dashboard (EPA)	DTXSID3021647
- InChI: InChI=1S/C5H8O3/c1-2-3-4(6)5(7)8/h2-3H2,1H3,(H,7,8) Key: KDVFRMMRZOCFLS-UHFFFAOYSA-N; InChI=1S/C5H8O3/c1-2-3-4(6)5(7)8/h2-3H2,1H3,(H,7,8)
- SMILES: O=C(C(=O)O)CCC

Properties
Chemical formula	C_{5}H_{8}O_{3}
Molar mass	116.116 g·mol^{−1}
- Except where otherwise noted, data are given for materials in their standard state (at 25 °C [77 °F], 100 kPa). verify (what is ?) Infobox references

α-Ketovaleric acid is a keto acid that is found in human blood. Unlike related keto acids, it is not an intermediate or metabolite associated with amino acids and its origin is unknown.

== See also ==
- α-Ketoisovaleric acid
- 3-Oxopentanoic acid (β-ketovaleric acid)
- Levulinic acid (γ-ketovaleric acid)
