= Tetrahydro-2-furoic acid =

Names
- Preferred IUPAC name Oxolane-2-carboxylic acid
- Other names Tetrahydro-2-furoic acid; Tetrahydrofuran-2-carboxylic acid; Tetrahydrofuroic acid

Identifiers
CAS Number	16874-33-2
3D model (JSmol)	Interactive image
ChEMBL	ChEMBL4447232
ChemSpider	77659
DrugBank	DB03051
ECHA InfoCard	100.122.132
EC Number	605-530-1
MeSH	C063698
PubChem CID	86079
UNII	CJ7M2QK6X3
CompTox Dashboard (EPA)	DTXSID601030927
- InChI: InChI=1S/C5H8O3/c6-5(7)4-2-1-3-8-4/h4H,1-3H2,(H,6,7) Key: UJJLJRQIPMGXEZ-UHFFFAOYSA-N
- SMILES: C1CC(OC1)C(=O)O

Properties
Chemical formula	C_{5}H_{8}O_{3}
Molar mass	116.116 g·mol^{−1}
Appearance	colorless oil
Density	1.262 g/cm^{3} @ 20 °C
Melting point	21 °C (70 °F; 294 K)
Boiling point	135 °C (275 °F; 408 K) 20 mmHg
- Except where otherwise noted, data are given for materials in their standard state (at 25 °C [77 °F], 100 kPa). Infobox references

Tetrahydro-2-furoic acid is an organic compound with the formula HO_{2}CC_{4}H_{7}O. It is a colorless oil. Tetrahydro-2-furoic acid is a useful pharmaceutical intermediate relevant to the production of several drugs, including Terazosin for the treatment of prostate enlargement and hypertension. or high boiling liquid,

== Synthesis ==
Furoic acid is reduced to tetrahydro-2-furoic acid, as originally reported in 1913 by Wienhaus. Tetrahydro-2-furoic acid has been prepared via selective hydrogenation of 2-furoic acid over a bimetallic catalyst of palladium-nickel supported on alumina.

Enantioselective heterogeneous hydrogenation of furoic acid to chiral tetrahydro-2-furoic acid proceeds in the presence of cinchonidine-modified alumina supported palladium catalyst in 95% yield and 32% enantiomeric excess. Similarly, homogeneous hydrogenation to chiral tetrahydro-2-furoic acid proceeds quantitatively with 24-27% enantiomeric excess in methanol solution employing a chiral, ferrocene-phosphine catalyst.

== Applications ==
=== Pharmaceuticals ===
Reaction of tetrahydro-2-furoic acid with the hydrochloride salt of 3-[(4-amino-6,7-dimethoxy-2-quinazolinyl)methylamino]-propanenitrile provided alfuzosin, a drug for the treatment of benign prostatic hyperplasia (BPH).

A key intermediate to faropenem, an antibiotic for the treatment of acute bacterial sinusitis, chronic bronchitis and pneumonia has been prepared from tetrahydro-2-furoic acid via a process including chiral resolution and chlorination.

Tecadenoson is another example of a drug made using tetrahydro-2-furoic acid.
