= Hydroxyethyl acrylate =

Organic chemical-monomer

Names
- IUPAC name 2-hydroxyethyl prop-2-enoate
- Other names HEA

Identifiers
CAS Number	818-61-1
3D model (JSmol)	Interactive image
ChEMBL	ChEMBL1330518
ChemSpider	12612
ECHA InfoCard	100.011.322
EC Number	212-454-9
PubChem CID	13165
RTECS number	AT1750000
UNII	25GT92NY0C
UN number	2927 1760
CompTox Dashboard (EPA)	DTXSID20891159 DTXSID2022123, DTXSID20891159
- InChI: InChI=1S/C5H8O3/c1-2-5(7)8-4-3-6/h2,6H,1,3-4H2 Key: OMIGHNLMNHATMP-UHFFFAOYSA-N
- SMILES: C=CC(=O)OCCO

Properties
Chemical formula	C_{5}H_{8}O_{3}
Molar mass	116.116 g·mol^{−1}
Appearance	colorless liquid
Density	1.106
Boiling point	220 °C (428 °F; 493 K)

Hazards
- GHS labelling
Pictograms	(GHS05: Corrosive) (GHS06: Toxic) (GHS09: Environmental hazard)
Signal word	Danger
Hazard statements	H311, H314, H317, H400
Precautionary statements	P260, P264, P272, P273, P280, P301+P330+P331, P302+P352, P302+P361+P354, P304+P340, P305+P354+P338, P316, P321, P333+P313, P361+P364, P362+P364, P363, P391, P405, P501
- Except where otherwise noted, data are given for materials in their standard state (at 25 °C [77 °F], 100 kPa). Infobox references

Hydroxyethyl acrylate is the organic compound with the formula CH_{2}=CHCO_{2}CH_{2}CH_{2}OH. It is a colorless viscous liquid. The compound has dual functionality: a polymerizable acrylic and a hydroxy group. It is a monomer used to make emulsion polymers along with other monomers and the resultant resins are used in coatings, sealants, adhesives and elastomers and other applications.

== Synthesis ==
A number of patents and synthesis papers describe its preparation. A traditional manufacturing process calls for the reaction of ethylene oxide with acrylic acid in the presence of a metal catalyst.

== Properties ==
The material is a water-white liquid with a mild but pungent ester like odor. It has a low freezing point.

== Applications ==
The most common use for the material is to be copolymerized with other acrylate and methacrylate monomers to make emulsion and other polymers including hydrogels. Modification of rubbers and similar compounds is also a use for the material. The resultant polymers may be used to manufacture pressure-sensitive adhesives.

== Toxicity ==
The toxicity of the material has been studied and is fairly well understood.

== See also ==
- (Hydroxyethyl)methacrylate
- Synthetic resin
