= 1,3-Dioxane =

Names
- Preferred IUPAC name 1,3-Dioxane
- Other names Formaldehyde trimethylene acetal

Identifiers
CAS Number	505-22-6
3D model (JSmol)	Interactive image
Beilstein Reference	102532
ChEBI	CHEBI:46924
ChemSpider	10018
ECHA InfoCard	100.007.278
EC Number	208-005-1
PubChem CID	10450
RTECS number	JG8224000
UNII	B2C8M17I09
UN number	1165
CompTox Dashboard (EPA)	DTXSID3025174
- InChI: InChI=1S/C4H8O2/c1-2-5-4-6-3-1/h1-4H2 Key: VDFVNEFVBPFDSB-UHFFFAOYSA-N
- SMILES: C1COCOC1

Properties
Chemical formula	C_{4}H_{8}O_{2}
Molar mass	88.106 g·mol^{−1}
Appearance	colorless liquid
Melting point	−42 °C (−44 °F; 231 K)
Boiling point	103 °C (217 °F; 376 K)

Hazards
- GHS labelling
Pictograms	(GHS02: Flammable) (GHS07: Exclamation mark)
Signal word	Danger
Hazard statements	H225, H302, H312, H315, H332
Precautionary statements	P210, P233, P240, P241, P242, P243, P261, P264, P270, P271, P280, P301+P312, P302+P352, P303+P361+P353, P304+P312, P304+P340, P312, P321, P322, P330, P332+P313, P362, P363, P370+P378, P403+P235, P501
Flash point	2 °C (36 °F; 275 K)
- Except where otherwise noted, data are given for materials in their standard state (at 25 °C [77 °F], 100 kPa). Infobox references

1,3-Dioxane or m-dioxane is an organic compound with the molecular formula (CH_{2})_{4}O_{2}. It is a saturated six-membered heterocycle with two oxygen atoms in place of carbon atoms at the 1- and 3- positions. 1,4-Dioxane, which is of greater commercial value, is an isomer. Both dioxanes are colorless liquids.

== Preparation and derivatives ==
The parent 1,3-dioxane is prepared by the reaction of formaldehyde and 1,3-propanediol in the presence of Brönsted or Lewis acid catalysts.

Substituted derivatives can be used as protecting groups for carbonyl compounds. are prepared from the reaction between a ketone or an aldehyde with 1,3-diols. They can also be produced by the Prins reaction.

== Related compounds ==
1,3-Dioxolanes are five-membered rings with the formula (CH_{2})_{3}O_{2}.

== See also ==
- 1,2-Dioxane
- 1,4-Dioxane
- Dithiane
