= 1,2-Butylene carbonate =

Names
- Preferred IUPAC name 4-Ethyl-1,3-dioxolan-2-one
- Other names 1,2-Butanediol carbonate 2-Oxo-4-ethyl-1,3-dioxolane

Identifiers
CAS Number	4437-85-8
3D model (JSmol)	Interactive image; Interactive image
ChemSpider	96547
ECHA InfoCard	100.216.269
PubChem CID	107282
UNII	I64G2S50OV
CompTox Dashboard (EPA)	DTXSID9040342
- InChI: InChI=1S/C5H8O3/c1-2-4-3-7-5(6)8-4/h4H,2-3H2,1H3 Key: ZZXUZKXVROWEIF-UHFFFAOYSA-N; InChI=1/C5H8O3/c1-2-4-3-7-5(6)8-4/h4H,2-3H2,1H3 Key: ZZXUZKXVROWEIF-UHFFFAOYAB
- SMILES: CCC1COC(=O)O1; O=C1OCC(O1)CC

Properties
Chemical formula	C_{5}H_{8}O_{3}
Molar mass	116.116 g·mol^{−1}
- Except where otherwise noted, data are given for materials in their standard state (at 25 °C [77 °F], 100 kPa). verify (what is ?) Infobox references

1,2-Butylene carbonate is an organic compound with formula C_{5}H_{8}O_{3}, or (H_{5}C_{2})(C_{2}H_{3})(CO_{3}). It is a double ester with the carbonate functional group bonded to both free ends of the 1,2-butylene group. It is also a heterocyclic compound with a five-membered ring, and can be seen as a derivative of dioxolane, specifically 4-ethyl-1,3-dioxolan-2-one.

1,2-Butylene carbonate is a polar aprotic solvent, which has been considered for electric battery applications (as a cheaper alternative to ionic liquids) and many other uses.

== See also ==
- Propylene carbonate
