= Dioxolane =

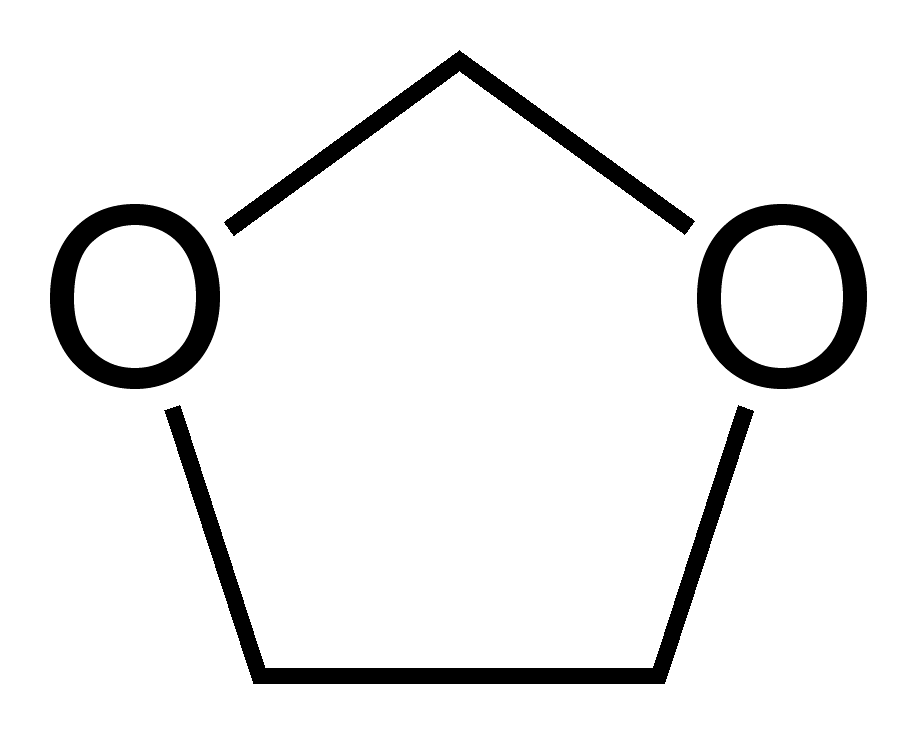

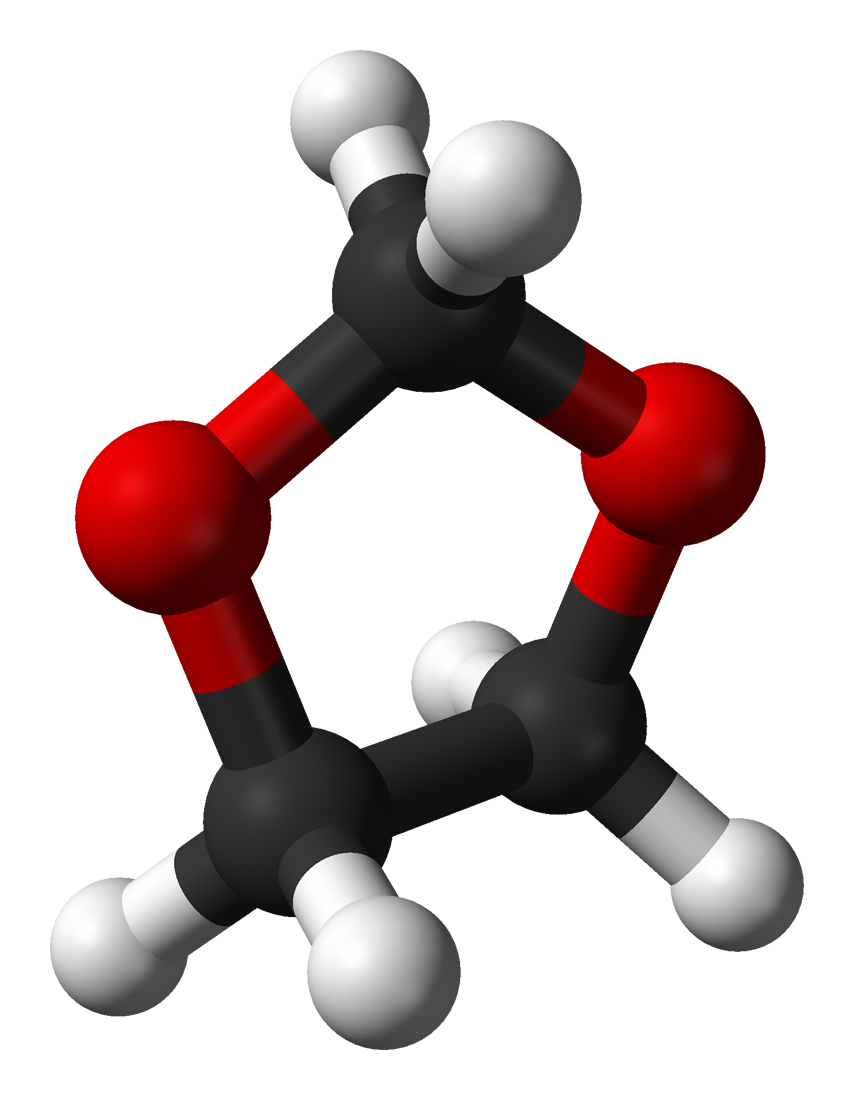

Names
- Preferred IUPAC name 1,3-Dioxolane
- Systematic IUPAC name 1,3-Dioxacyclopentane
- Other names Dioxolane; 5-Crown-2; Formal glycol

Identifiers
CAS Number	646-06-0
3D model (JSmol)	Interactive image
ChEBI	CHEBI:87597
ChEMBL	ChEMBL3187281
ChemSpider	12066
ECHA InfoCard	100.010.422
EC Number	211-463-5
PubChem CID	12586
UNII	Y57RBG19JL
UN number	1166
CompTox Dashboard (EPA)	DTXSID4027284
- InChI: InChI=1S/C3H6O2/c1-2-4-5-3-1/h1-3H2 Key: SNQXJPARXFUULZ-UHFFFAOYSA-N; InChI=1/C3H6O2/c1-2-4-5-3-1/h1-3H2 Key: SNQXJPARXFUULZ-UHFFFAOYAS
- SMILES: O1CCOC1

Properties
Chemical formula	C_{3}H_{6}O_{2}
Molar mass	74.08 g/mol
Density	1.06 g/cm^{3}
Melting point	−95 °C (−139 °F; 178 K)
Boiling point	75 °C (167 °F; 348 K)

Hazards
- GHS labelling
Pictograms	(GHS02: Flammable)
Signal word	Danger
Hazard statements	H225
Precautionary statements	P210, P233, P240, P241, P242, P243, P280, P303+P361+P353, P370+P378, P403+P235, P501
- Except where otherwise noted, data are given for materials in their standard state (at 25 °C [77 °F], 100 kPa). verify (what is ?) Infobox references

Dioxolane is a heterocyclic acetal with the chemical formula (CH_{2})_{2}O_{2}CH_{2}. It is related to tetrahydrofuran (THF) by replacement of the methylene group (CH_{2}) at the 3-position with an oxygen atom. The corresponding saturated 6-membered C_{4}O_{2} rings are called dioxanes. The isomeric 1,2-dioxolane (wherein the two oxygen centers are adjacent) is a peroxide. 1,3-dioxolane is used as a solvent and as a comonomer in polyacetals.

== As a class of compounds ==
Dioxolanes are a group of organic compounds containing the dioxolane ring. Dioxolanes can be prepared by acetalization of aldehydes and ketalization of ketones with ethylene glycol.

synthesis of dioxolane group

(+)-cis-Dioxolane is the trivial name for L-(+)-cis-2-methyl-4-trimethylammoniummethyl-1,3-dioxolane iodide which is a muscarinic acetylcholine receptor agonist.

== Protecting groups ==
Organic compounds containing carbonyl groups sometimes need protection so that they do not undergo reactions during transformations of other functional groups that may be present. A variety of approaches to protection and deprotection of carbonyls including as dioxolanes are known. For example, consider the compound methyl cyclohexanone-4-carboxylate, where lithium aluminium hydride reduction will produce 4-hydroxymethylcyclohexanol. The ester functional group can be reduced without affecting the ketone by protecting the ketone as a ketal. The ketal is produced by acid catalysed reaction with ethylene glycol, the reduction reaction carried out, and the protecting group removed by hydrolysis to produce 4-hydroxymethylcyclohexanone.

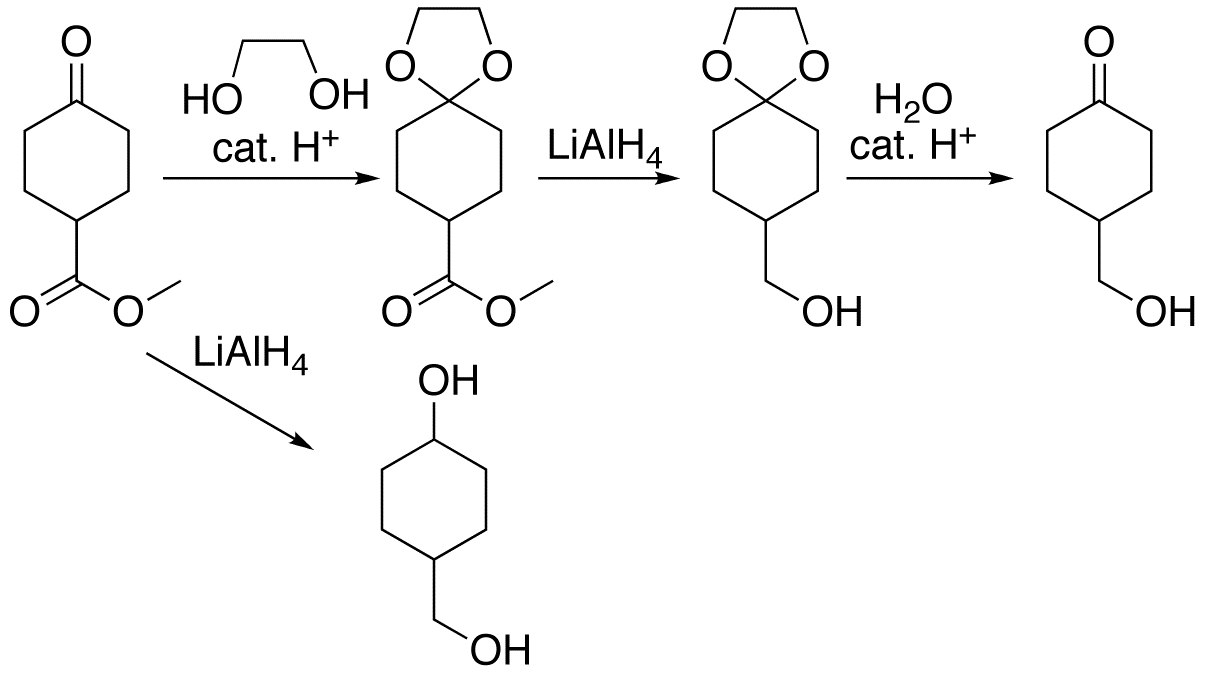

NaBArF_{4} can also be used for deprotection of acetal or ketal-protected carbonyl compounds. For example, deprotection of 2-phenyl-1,3-dioxolane to benzaldehyde can be achieved in water in five minutes at 30 °C.

PhCH(OCH_{2})_{2} + H_{2}O $\ce{->[\ce{NaBAr4}][\text{30 °C / 5 min}]}$ PhCHO + HOCH_{2}CH_{2}OH

== Natural products ==
Neosporol is a natural product that includes a 1,3-dioxolane moiety, and is an isomer of sporol which has a 1,3-dioxane ring. The total synthesis of both compounds has been reported, and each includes a step in which a dioxolane system is formed using trifluoroperacetic acid (TFPAA), prepared by the hydrogen peroxide – urea method. This method involves no water, so it gives a completely anhydrous peracid, necessary in this case as the presence of water would lead to unwanted side reactions.

CF_{3}COOCOCF_{3} + H_{2}O_{2}•CO(NH_{2})_{2} → CF_{3}COOOH + CF_{3}COOH + CO(NH_{2})_{2}

In the case of neosporol, a Prilezhaev reaction with trifluoroperacetic acid is used to convert a suitable allyl alcohol precursor to an epoxide, which then undergoes a ring-expansion reaction with a proximate carbonyl functional group to form the dioxolane ring.

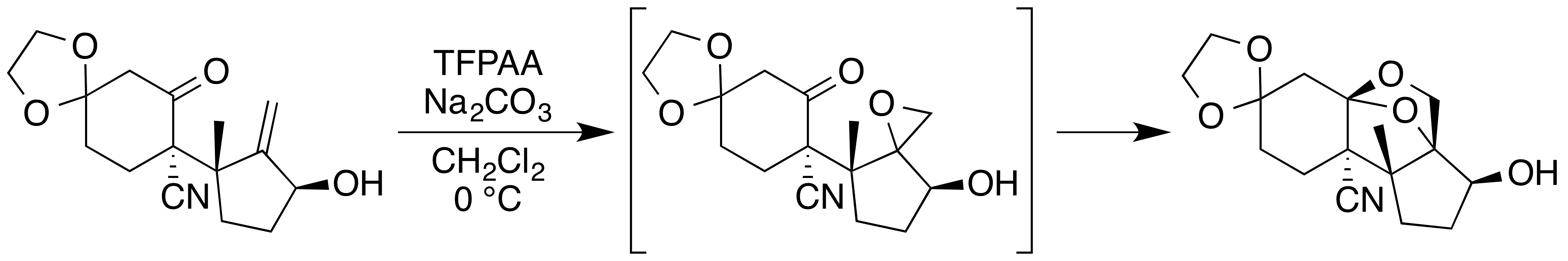

A similar approach is used in the total synthesis of sporol, with the dioxolane ring later expanded to a dioxane system.

== See also ==
- Dioxane
