= 3-Oxopentanoic acid =

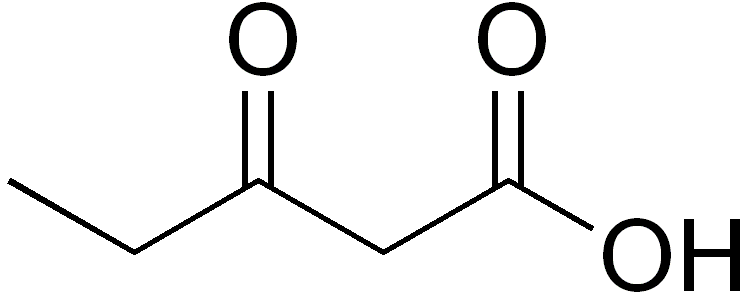

Names
- Preferred IUPAC name 3-Oxopentanoic acid
- Other names β-Ketopentanoate; 3-Oxopentanoate; 3-Oxovaleric acid 3-Ketovaleric acid

Identifiers
CAS Number	10191-25-0
3D model (JSmol)	Interactive image; Interactive image
ChEBI	CHEBI:27401
ChemSpider	388751
KEGG	C02233
PubChem CID	439684
UNII	090PW368EP
CompTox Dashboard (EPA)	DTXSID50331432
- InChI: InChI=1S/C5H8O3/c1-2-4(6)3-5(7)8/h2-3H2,1H3,(H,7,8) Key: FHSUFDYFOHSYHI-UHFFFAOYSA-N; InChI=1/C5H8O3/c1-2-4(6)3-5(7)8/h2-3H2,1H3,(H,7,8) Key: FHSUFDYFOHSYHI-UHFFFAOYAQ
- SMILES: CCC(=O)CC(=O)O; O=C(CC)CC(=O)O

Properties
Chemical formula	C_{5}H_{8}O_{3}
Molar mass	116.12 g/mol
- Except where otherwise noted, data are given for materials in their standard state (at 25 °C [77 °F], 100 kPa). verify (what is ?) Infobox references

3-Oxopentanoic acid, or beta-ketopentanoate, is a 5-carbon ketone body. It is made from odd carbon fatty acids in the liver and rapidly enters the brain.

As opposed to 4-carbon ketone bodies, beta-ketopentanoate is anaplerotic, meaning it can refill the pool of TCA cycle intermediates. The triglyceride triheptanoin is used clinically to produce beta-ketopentanoate.
