= Dimesityldioxirane =

Chemical compound

Names
- IUPAC name 3,3-bis(2,4,6-trimethylphenyl)dioxirane

Identifiers
CAS Number	161807-01-8
3D model (JSmol)	Interactive image
ChemSpider	74833282
PubChem CID	86180054
- InChI: InChI=1S/C19H22O2/c1-11-7-13(3)17(14(4)8-11)19(20-21-19)18-15(5)9-12(2)10-16(18)6/h7-10H,1-6H3 Key: CIQXXABRSWBHGW-UHFFFAOYSA-N
- SMILES: CC1=CC(=C(C(=C1)C)C2(OO2)C3=C(C=C(C=C3C)C)C)C

Properties
Chemical formula	C_{19}H_{22}O_{2}
Molar mass	282.4 g/mol
Density	1.180 g/cm^{3} (calculated, 173 K)
Melting point	62–64 °C (144–147 °F; 335–337 K) (partial decomp.)
Solubility	Soluble in trichlorofluoromethane, carbon tetrachloride, chloroform, methanol

Structure
Crystal structure	Orthorhombic, oP
Space group	Pbca, No. 61
Lattice constant	a = 15.970 Å, b = 7.956 Å, c = 25.018 Å (at 173 K)
Lattice volume (V)	3178.7 Å^{3}
Formula units (Z)	8
- Except where otherwise noted, data are given for materials in their standard state (at 25 °C [77 °F], 100 kPa). Infobox references

Dimesityldioxirane is a substituted dioxirane with two mesityl groups attached to the dioxirane carbon. It is a colorless crystalline substance, indefinitely stable at −20 °C.

== Structure ==
In the solid phase, the molecule possesses approximate C_{2} symmetry; under B3LYP this is predicted to be an exact symmetry, with each mesityl group being twisted away from coplanarity by 54.2°. The bulky mesityl groups cause steric strain, which is compensated for by an increase in the R_{1}–C–R_{2} angle from 117° in dioxirane to 119.2° in dimesityldioxirane, together with rotation of the mesityl groups out of plane. This in turn yields a narrower O–C–O angle and a shorter and stronger O–O bond than in other dioxiranes, stabilizing the molecule.

== Synthesis ==
Dimesityldioxirane was first isolated at room temperature in pure as well as in solution form in 1994. It was synthesised by irradiation of dimesityldiazomethane, its diazo derivative, in oxygen-saturated trichlorofluoromethane at 183 K to form dimesitylcarbene, which reacts to form dimesityldioxirane via a carbonyl oxide intermediate, with overall yield 50%.

== Stability ==
Pure dimesityldioxirane is indefinitely stable at −20 °C in the absence of light, in both solid form and trichlorofluoromethane solution. Upon exposure to blue light, it undergoes photolysis to mesityl 2,4,6-trimethylbenzoate. In solid form at room temperature, it decomposes over a period of weeks to dimesitylketone and mesityl 2,4,6-trimethylbenzoate. In methanol solution at room temperature, it decomposes over a period of hours to days, while also slowly oxidizing the solvent.

== Reactions ==
Like other dioxiranes, it is a potent oxygen-transfer reagent, driving characteristic reactions such as the epoxidation of cyclohexene.

== See also ==
- Difluorodioxirane
- Dimethyldioxirane
- Shi epoxidation
