= Trifluoroacetone =

One of the lightest perfluoro compounds

1,1,1-Trifluoroacetone

Names
- Preferred IUPAC name 1,1,1-Trifluoropropan-2-one
- Other names Trifluoracetone, TFA

Identifiers
| CAS Number | 421-50-1 |
| 3D model (JSmol) | Interactive image |
| ChemSpider | 21111803 |
| ECHA InfoCard | 100.006.370 |
| EC Number | 207-005-9 |
| PubChem CID | 9871 |
| UNII | K987U5C2CX |
| CompTox Dashboard (EPA) | DTXSID9059963 |
- InChI: InChI=1S/C3H3F3O/c1-2(7)3(4,5)6/h1H3 Key: FHUDAMLDXFJHJE-UHFFFAOYSA-N
- SMILES: CC(=O)C(F)(F)F

Properties
| Chemical formula | C_{3}H_{3}F_{3}O |
| Molar mass | 112.051 g·mol^{−1} |
| Appearance | Colorless liquid |
| Density | 1.252 g/mL |
| Melting point | −78 °C (−108 °F; 195 K) |
| Boiling point | 21–24 °C (70–75 °F; 294–297 K) |

Hazards
- GHS labelling
| Pictograms | (GHS02: Flammable) (GHS07: Exclamation mark) |
| Signal word | Danger |
| Hazard statements | H224, H315, H319, H335 |
| Precautionary statements | P210, P261, P303, P338, P351 |
| Flash point | −30 °C (−22 °F; 243 K) |
- Except where otherwise noted, data are given for materials in their standard state (at 25 °C [77 °F], 100 kPa). Infobox references

Trifluoroacetone (1,1,1-trifluoroacetone) is an organofluorine compound with the chemical formula CF_{3}C(O)CH_{3}. The compound is a colorless liquid with chloroform-like odour.

== Preparation, reactions, uses ==
Trifluoroacetone is produced from trifluoroacetoacetic acid, which is synthesized by condensation of ethyl trifluoroacetate and ethyl acetate:

CF_{3}CO_{2}C_{2}H_{5} + CH_{3}CO_{2}C_{2}H_{5} → CF_{3}C(O)CH_{2}CO_{2}C_{2}H_{5} + C_{2}H_{5}OH

Hydrolysis of the keto-ester, followed by decarboxylation affords trifluoroacetone:

CF_{3}C(O)CH_{2}CO_{2}C_{2}H_{5} + H_{2}O → CF_{3}C(O)CH_{2}CO_{2}H + C_{2}H_{5}OH

CF_{3}C(O)CH_{2}CO_{2}H → CF_{3}C(O)CH_{3} + CO_{2}

Alternatively, addition of methylmagnesium iodide to trifluoroacetic acid gives the ketone according to this idealized equation:

CF_{3}CO_{2}H + 2 CH_{3}MgI → CF_{3}C(O)CH_{3} + MgI_{2} + CH_{4} + MgO

== Reactions ==
Many studies report on the reactions of trifluoroacetone. It is less prone to hydrate than hexafluoroacetone and more electrophilic than acetone itself. Unlike both of those ketones, trifluoroacetone is prochiral.

Hydrogenation of trifluoroacetone over platinum catalyst gives trifluoroisopropanol. The reduction can also be achieved asymmetrically. Similarly, alkylation with Grignard reagents provides a route to tertiary alcohols. Alkylation and arylation can be achieved using malonate anions and arenes/AlCl_{3}, respectively.

Trifluoroacetone has been converted to the dioxirane using oxone.

It serves as an oxidizing agent in Oppenauer oxidation.

Trifluoracetone is also used in a synthesis of 2-trifluoromethyl-7-azaindoles starting with 2,6-dihalopyridines. The derived chiral imine is used to prepare enantiopure α-trifluoromethyl alanines and diamines by a Strecker reaction followed by either nitrile hydrolysis or reduction.

== See also ==
- Hexafluoroacetone
- Trifluoroacetic acid – also abbreviated TFA
