= Difluorodioxirane =

Chemical compound

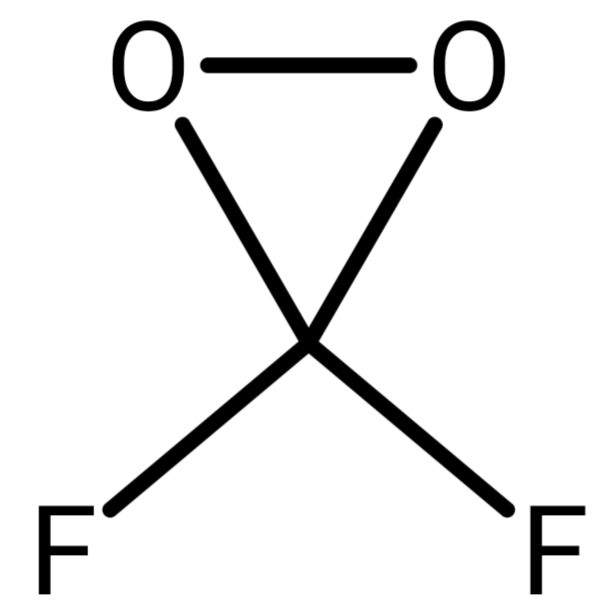

Names
- IUPAC name 3,3-difluorodioxirane
- Other names: DFDO; Difluordioxiran; Dioxirane, 3,3-difluoro-; Dioxirane, difluoro-

Identifiers
CAS Number	96740-99-7
3D model (JSmol)	Interactive image
ChemSpider	9280438
PubChem CID	11105302
CompTox Dashboard (EPA)	DTXSID30455266
- InChI: InChI=1S/CF2O2/c2-1(3)4-5-1 Key: QDWGHBBFJKJQRE-UHFFFAOYSA-N
- SMILES: FC1(F)OO1

Properties
Chemical formula	CF_{2}O_{2}
Molar mass	82.006 g/mol
Density	1.7±0.1 g/cm^{3}
Boiling point	-129.6±35.0 °C at 760 mmHg
Vapor pressure	86623.3±0.2 mmHg

Hazards
Flash point	-121.8±21.8 °C
- Except where otherwise noted, data are given for materials in their standard state (at 25 °C [77 °F], 100 kPa). Infobox references

Difluorodioxirane (CF_{2}O_{2}) is a rare, stable member of the dioxirane family, known for a single oxygen-oxygen bond (O-O). Unlike most dioxiranes that decompose quickly, difluorodioxirane is surprisingly stable at room temperature, making it potentially useful for further research and applications.

== Synthesis ==
Difluorodioxirane was first synthesised by Russo and DesMarteau in 1993 by treating fluorocarbonyl hypofluorite (FCOOF) with X_{2} (= F2, Cl2 or ClF) over pelletized CsF in a flow system.

It also likely exists as a possible intermediate in reactions involving other fluorine-containing compounds.

== Properties ==
Unlike most dioxiranes that decompose quickly, difluorodioxirane is surprisingly stable at room temperature due to the stabilising interaction of two fluorine atoms with the ring. This effect makes the O-O bond less reactive and more stable compared to other dioxiranes. The central F–C–F angle is 109°, approximately a tetrahedral angle.

Difluorodioxirane is known for its ability to perform regiospecific and stereoselective oxidations. This makes it a valuable tool in organic synthesis for precise manipulation of molecules.

Despite its increased stability, difluorodioxirane can still act as an oxidizing agent, transferring oxygen to other molecules. It often leads to cleaner and more predictable reaction outcomes due to its controlled reactivity.

== Uses ==
Difluorodioxirane itself has not yet found widespread applications due to its recent discovery. However, its unique stability and reactivity similar to other dioxiranes suggest potential uses in several areas:

- Organic synthesis: Due to its oxidizing properties, difluorodioxirane could be a valuable reagent in organic reactions, particularly for controlled oxidation processes. Researchers are exploring its potential applications in epoxidation (adding oxygen atoms to create epoxide rings), hydroxylation (adding hydroxyl groups -OH), and other oxidation reactions.
- Development of new catalysts: The stability and reactivity profile of difluorodioxirane make it a promising candidate for the development of new and more efficient catalysts for various organic transformations.

== See also ==
- Dimesityldioxirane
- Dimethyldioxirane
- Shi epoxidation
