= Dimethyldioxirane =

Chemical compound

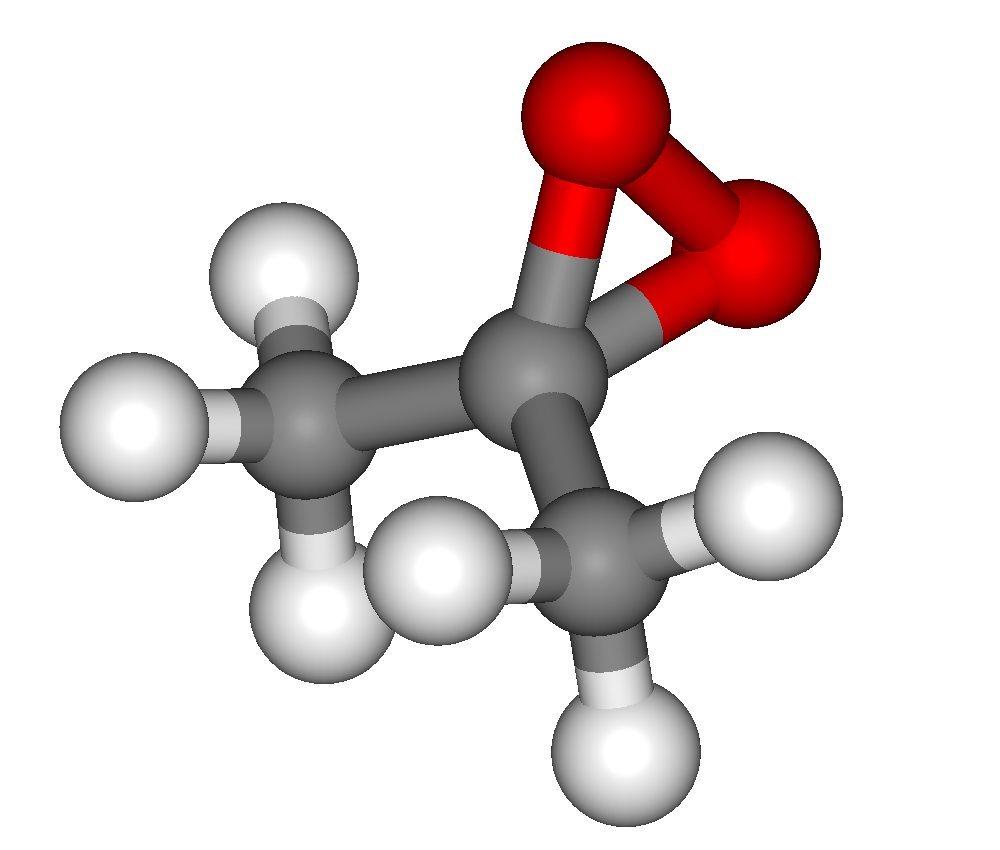

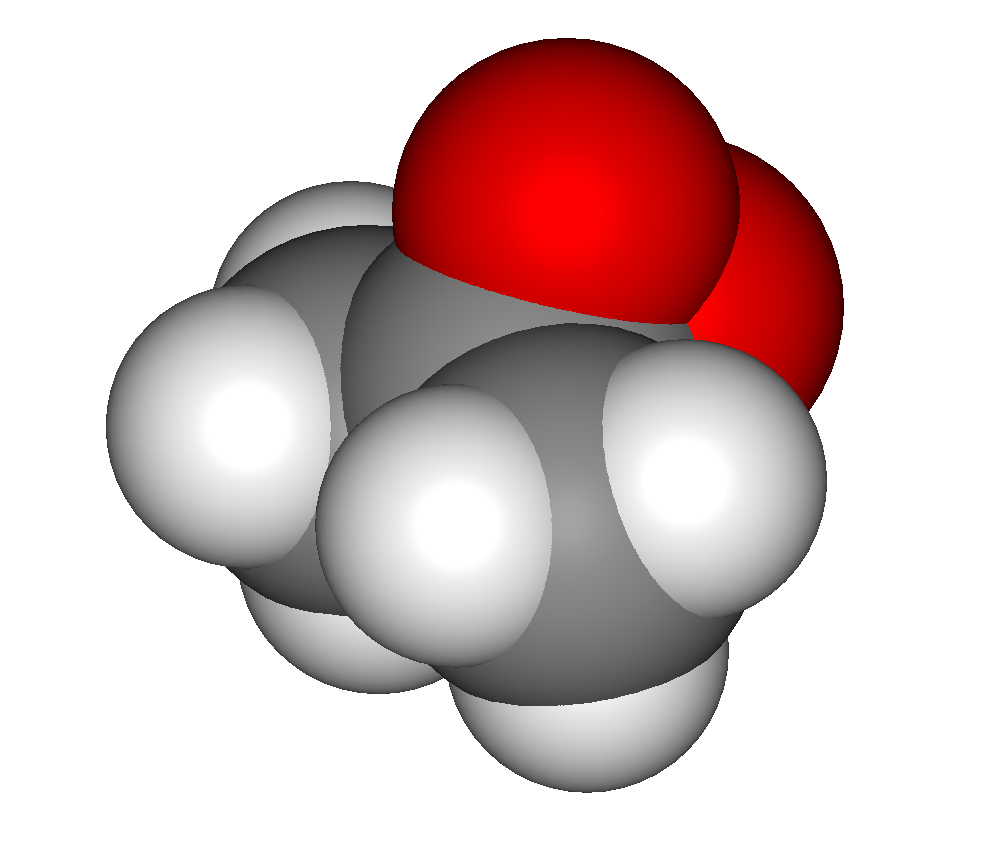
- Carbon, C Hydrogen, H Oxygen, O

Names
- IUPAC name 3,3-Dimethyldioxirane
- Other names DMDO; Monoperoxyacetone, Murray's reagent

Identifiers
CAS Number	74087-85-7
3D model (JSmol)	Interactive image
ChemSpider	103073
PubChem CID	115197
UNII	R5RAT196DJ
CompTox Dashboard (EPA)	DTXSID90224990
- InChI: InChI=1S/C3H6O2/c1-3(2)4-5-3/h1-2H3 Key: FFHWGQQFANVOHV-UHFFFAOYSA-N; InChI=1/C3H6O2/c1-3(2)4-5-3/h1-2H3 Key: FFHWGQQFANVOHV-UHFFFAOYAF
- SMILES: CC1(OO1)C

Properties
Chemical formula	C_{3}H_{6}O_{2}
Molar mass	74.08 g/mol
- Except where otherwise noted, data are given for materials in their standard state (at 25 °C [77 °F], 100 kPa). verify (what is ?) Infobox references

Dimethyldioxirane (DMDO) is the organic compound with the formula (CH_{3})_{2}CO_{2}. It is the dioxirane derived from acetone and can be viewed as the monomer of acetone peroxide. It is a powerful selective oxidizing agent that finds some use in organic synthesis. It is known only in the form of a dilute solution, usually in acetone, and hence the properties of the pure material are largely unknown.

== Synthesis ==
DMDO is not commercially available because of chemical instability. DMDO can be prepared as dilute solutions (~0.1 M) by treatment of acetone with potassium peroxymonosulfate KHSO_{5}, usually in the form of Oxone (2KHSO_{5}·KHSO_{4}·K_{2}SO_{4}).

The preparation of DMDO is rather inefficient (typical yields < 3%) and typically only yields a relatively dilute solution in acetone (only up to approximately 0.1 M). This is tolerable as preparation uses inexpensive substances: acetone, sodium bicarbonate, and oxone. Cold solutions (−10 to −20 °C) of DMDO are stable for days. Decomposition is accelerated by light and by heavy metals. The concentration of DMDO may be assayed immediately prior to its use.

Methyl(trifluoromethyl)dioxirane (H_{3}C)(F_{3}C)CO_{2} can be similarly prepared from methyl trifluoromethyl ketone. It is a stronger oxidant than DMDO.

So-called "acetone-free" DMDO can be prepared by extracting the oxidant into dichloromethane or similar solvents. Although there is still acetone present, it is only in small amounts rather than as the bulk solvent, and the DMDO in the resulting solution can be up to several-fold more concentrated.

== Uses ==
DMDO is most commonly used for the oxidation of alkenes to epoxides. One advantage of using DMDO is that the only byproduct of oxidation is acetone, a fairly innocuous and volatile compound. DMDO oxidations are particularly mild, sometimes allowing oxidations which might not otherwise be possible. Solvent-free DMDO is even milder towards certain sensitive off-target groups in the substrate.

Despite its high reactivity, DMDO displays good selectivity for electron-rich olefins. DMDO will also oxidize several other functional groups. For example, DMDO will oxidize primary amines to nitro compounds and sulfides to sulfoxides. In some cases, DMDO will even oxidize unactivated C-H bonds:

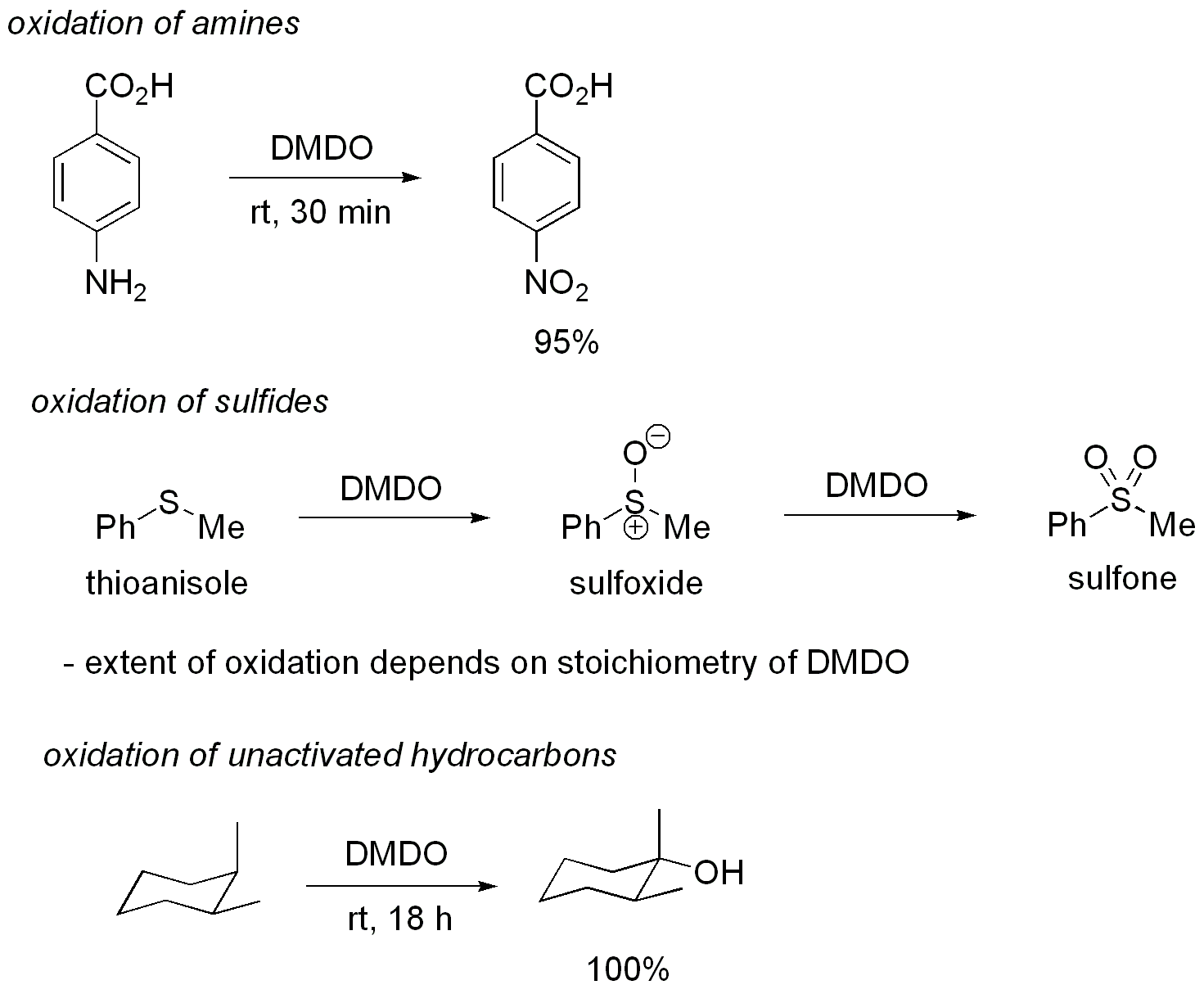

DMDO can also be used to convert nitro compounds to carbonyl compounds (Nef reaction).

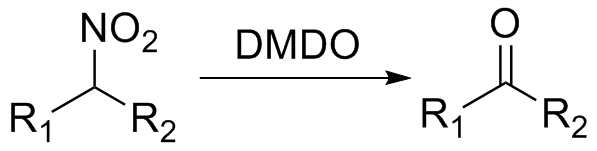

== See also ==
- Difluorodioxirane
- Dioxirane
- Shi epoxidation
