= Epoxide =

Organic compounds with a carbon-carbon-oxygen ring

A generic epoxide

In organic chemistry, an epoxide is a cyclic ether, where the ether forms a three-atom ring: two atoms of carbon and one atom of oxygen. This triangular structure has substantial ring strain, making epoxides highly reactive, more so than other ethers. They are produced on a large scale for many applications. In general, low molecular weight epoxides are colourless and nonpolar, and often volatile.

== Nomenclature ==
A compound containing the epoxide functional group can be called an epoxy, epoxide, oxirane, and ethoxyline. Simple epoxides are often referred to as oxides. Thus, the epoxide of ethylene (C_{2}H_{4}) is ethylene oxide (C_{2}H_{4}O). Many compounds have trivial names; for instance, ethylene oxide is called "oxirane". Some names emphasize the presence of the epoxide functional group, as in the compound 1,2-epoxyheptane, which can also be called 1,2-heptene oxide.

A polymer formed from epoxide precursors is called an epoxy. However, few if any of the epoxy groups in the resin survive the curing process.

== Synthesis ==
The dominant epoxides industrially are ethylene oxide and propylene oxide, which are produced respectively on the scales of approximately 15 million and 3 million tonnes/year.

Aside from ethylene oxide, most epoxides are generated when peroxidized reagents donate a single oxygen atom to an alkene. Safety considerations weigh on these reactions because organic peroxides are prone to spontaneous decomposition or even combustion.

Both t-butyl hydroperoxide and ethylbenzene hydroperoxide can be used as oxygen sources during propylene oxidation (although a catalyst is required as well, and most industrial producers use dehydrochlorination instead).

=== Ethylene oxidation ===
The ethylene oxide industry generates its product from reaction of ethylene and oxygen. Modified heterogeneous silver catalysts are typically employed. According to a reaction mechanism suggested in 1974 at least one ethylene molecule is totally oxidized for every six that are converted to ethylene oxide:
$$\ce{7 H2C=CH2  +  6 O2  ->  6 C2H4O  +  2 CO2  +  2 H2O}$$

Only ethylene produces an epoxide during incomplete combustion. Other alkenes fail to react usefully, even propylene, though TS-1 supported Au catalysts can selectively epoxidize propylene.

=== Organic peroxides and metal catalysts ===
Metal complexes are useful catalysts for epoxidations involving hydrogen peroxide and alkyl hydroperoxides. Metal-catalyzed epoxidations were first explored using tert-butyl hydroperoxide (TBHP). Association of TBHP with the metal (M) generates the active metal peroxy complex containing the MOOR group, which then transfers an O center to the alkene.

Simplified mechanism for metal-catalyzed epoxidation of alkenes with peroxide (ROOH) reagents

Vanadium(II) oxide catalyzes the epoxidation at specifically less-substituted alkenes.

=== Nucleophilic epoxidation ===
Electron-deficient olefins, such as enones and acryl derivatives can be epoxidized using nucleophilic oxygen compounds such as peroxides. The reaction is a two-step mechanism. First the oxygen performs a nucleophilic conjugate addition to give a stabilized carbanion. This carbanion then attacks the same oxygen atom, displacing a leaving group from it, to close the epoxide ring.

=== Transfer from peroxycarboxylic acids ===
Peroxycarboxylic acids, which are more electrophilic than other peroxides, convert alkenes to epoxides without the intervention of metal catalysts. In specialized applications, dioxirane reagents (e.g. dimethyldioxirane) perform similarly, but are more explosive.

Typical laboratory operations employ the Prilezhaev reaction. This approach involves the oxidation of the alkene with a peroxyacid such as mCPBA. Illustrative is the epoxidation of styrene with perbenzoic acid to styrene oxide:

The stereochemistry of the reaction is quite sensitive. Depending on the mechanism of the reaction and the geometry of the alkene starting material, cis and/or trans epoxide diastereomers may be formed. In addition, if there are other stereocenters present in the starting material, they can influence the stereochemistry of the epoxidation.

The reaction proceeds via what is commonly known as the "Butterfly Mechanism". The peroxide is viewed as an electrophile, and the alkene a nucleophile. The reaction is considered to be concerted. The butterfly mechanism allows ideal positioning of the O−O sigma star orbital for C−C π electrons to attack. Because two bonds are broken and formed to the epoxide oxygen, this is formally an example of a coarctate transition state.

The butterfly mechanism for the Prilezhaev epoxidation reaction.

=== Asymmetric epoxidations ===
Chiral epoxides are produced by epoxidation of prochiral alkenes. When the catalyst is chiral or the alkene is chiral, then asymmetric epoxidation becomes possible. Prominent methodologies are the Sharpless epoxidation, the Jacobsen epoxidation, and the Shi epoxidation.

=== Dehydrohalogenation and other γ eliminations ===
Epichlorohydrin, is prepared by the chlorohydrin method. It is a precursor in the production of epoxy resins.

Halohydrins react with base to give epoxides. The reaction is spontaneous because the energetic cost of introducing the ring strain (13 kcal/mol) is offset by the larger bond enthalpy of the newly introduced C-O bond (when compared to that of the cleaved C-halogen bond).

Formation of epoxides from secondary halohydrins is predicted to occur faster than from primary halohydrins due to increased entropic effects in the secondary halohydrin, and tertiary halohydrins react (if at all) extremely slowly due to steric crowding.

Starting with propylene chlorohydrin, most of the world's supply of propylene oxide arises via this route.

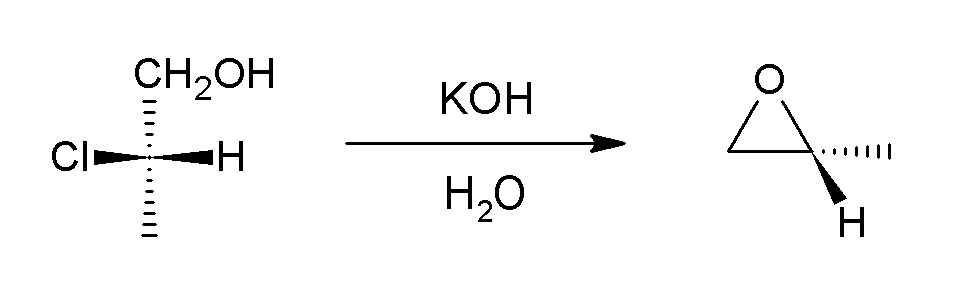

An intramolecular epoxide formation reaction is one of the key steps in the Darzens reaction.

In the Johnson–Corey–Chaykovsky reaction epoxides are generated from carbonyl groups and sulfonium ylides. In this reaction, a sulfonium is the leaving group instead of chloride.

=== Biosynthesis ===
Epoxides are uncommon in nature. They arise usually via oxygenation of alkenes by the action of cytochrome P450. (but see also the short-lived epoxyeicosatrienoic acids which act as signalling molecules. and similar epoxydocosapentaenoic acids, and epoxyeicosatetraenoic acids.)

Arene oxides are intermediates in the oxidation of arenes by cytochrome P450. For prochiral arenes (naphthalene, toluene, benzoates, benzopyrene), the epoxides are often obtained in high enantioselectivity.

== Reactions ==
Ring-opening reactions dominate the reactivity of epoxides.

=== Hydrolysis and addition of nucleophiles ===
Two pathways for the hydrolysis of an epoxide

Epoxides react with a broad range of nucleophiles, for example, alcohols, water, amines, thiols, and even halides. With two often-nearly-equivalent sites of attack, epoxides exemplify "ambident substrates". Ring-opening regioselectivity in asymmetric epoxides generally follows the S_{N}2 pattern of attack at the least-substituted carbon, but can be affected by carbocation stability under acidic conditions. This class of reactions is the basis of epoxy glues and the production of glycols.

Lithium aluminium hydride or aluminium hydride both reduce epoxides through a simple nucleophilic addition of hydride (H^{−}); they produce the corresponding alcohol.

=== Polymerization and oligomerization ===
Polymerization of epoxides gives polyethers. For example ethylene oxide polymerizes to give polyethylene glycol, also known as polyethylene oxide. The reaction of an alcohol or a phenol with ethylene oxide, ethoxylation, is widely used to produce surfactants:

ROH + n C_{2}H_{4}O → R(OC_{2}H_{4})_{n}OH

With anhydrides, epoxides give polyesters.

=== Metallation and deoxygenation ===
Lithiation cleaves the ring to β-lithioalkoxides.

Epoxides can be deoxygenated using oxophilic reagents, with loss or retention of configuration. The combination of tungsten hexachloride and n-butyllithium gives the alkene.

When treated with thiourea or triphenylphosphine sulfide, epoxides convert to the episulfide (thiiranes). But triphenylphosphine selenide or a selenathiocarbamate in strong acid deoxygenates to the olefin instead.

=== Other reactions ===
- Titanocene monochloride opens epoxides to α-radical alkoxides, which can then be trapped by e.g. a hydrogen donor.
- Epoxides undergo ring expansion reactions, illustrated by the insertion of carbon dioxide to give cyclic carbonates.
- An epoxide adjacent to an alcohol can undergo the Payne rearrangement in base.

== Uses ==
Illustrative epoxides
Bisphenol A diglycidyl ether is a component in common household "epoxy".

The chemical structure of the epoxide glycidol, a common chemical intermediate.

Epothilones are naturally occurring epoxides.

3,4-Epoxycyclohexylmethyl-3',4'-epoxycyclohexane carboxylate, precursor to coatings.

Epoxidized linolein, a major component of epoxidized soybean oil (ESBO), a commercially important plasticizer.

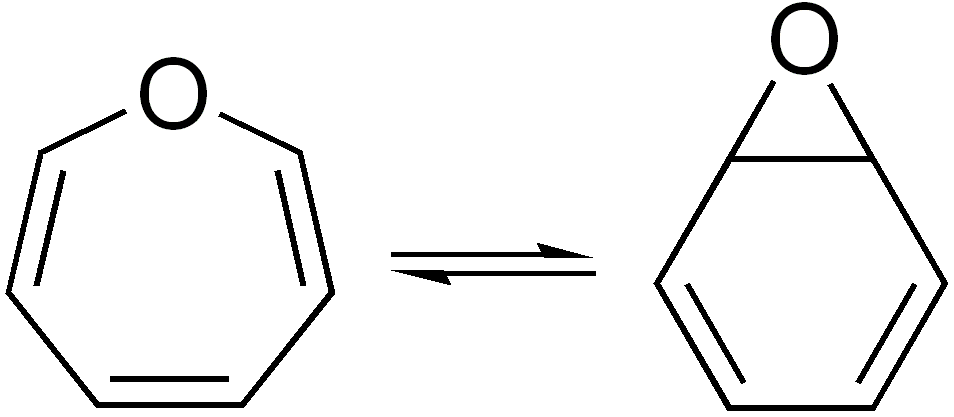
Benzene oxide exists in equilibrium with the oxepin isomer.

Ethylene oxide is widely used to generate detergents and surfactants by ethoxylation. Its hydrolysis affords ethylene glycol. It is also used for sterilisation of medical instruments and materials.

The reaction of epoxides with amines is the basis for the formation of epoxy glues and structural materials. A typical amine-hardener is triethylenetetramine (TETA).

Ethyl methylphenylglycidate is used as an artificial strawberry scent and flavor.

== Safety ==
Some epoxides, such as the trichothecene mycotoxins and the plastic precursor epichlorohydrin are highly toxic alkylating agents.

== See also ==
- Epoxide hydrolase
- Juliá–Colonna epoxidation
- Aziridine (nitrogen analogue) and thiirane (sulfur one)
- Cyclopropane
- Oxaziridine (cyclic three-membered ring with C, N, and O)
