= Asymmetric epoxidation =

Asymmetric epoxidation is a subset of asymmetric catalytic oxidations. Epoxidations convert prochiral (and other) alkenes to chiral epoxide derivatives. In asymmetric epoxidation, the two chiral products are produced in unequal amounts. The same catalysts are useful in the diastereoselective epoxidations, whereby one chiral alkene epoxidizes more rapidly than its enantiomer.

Two popular versions of asymmetric epoxidations are:

- Sharpless epoxidation, which uses titanium-based catalyst and tartrate esters as the chiral ligand. This methodology is one of the premier enantioselective chemical reactions. It is used to prepare 2,3-epoxyalcohols from primary and secondary allylic alcohols.

- Jacobsen epoxidation, which uses a manganese-based catalyst supported by a chiral salen ligand.
- Shi epoxidation, which uses a chiral organocatalyst and potassium peroxymonosulfate as the O atom source
