= Thenoyltrifluoroacetone =

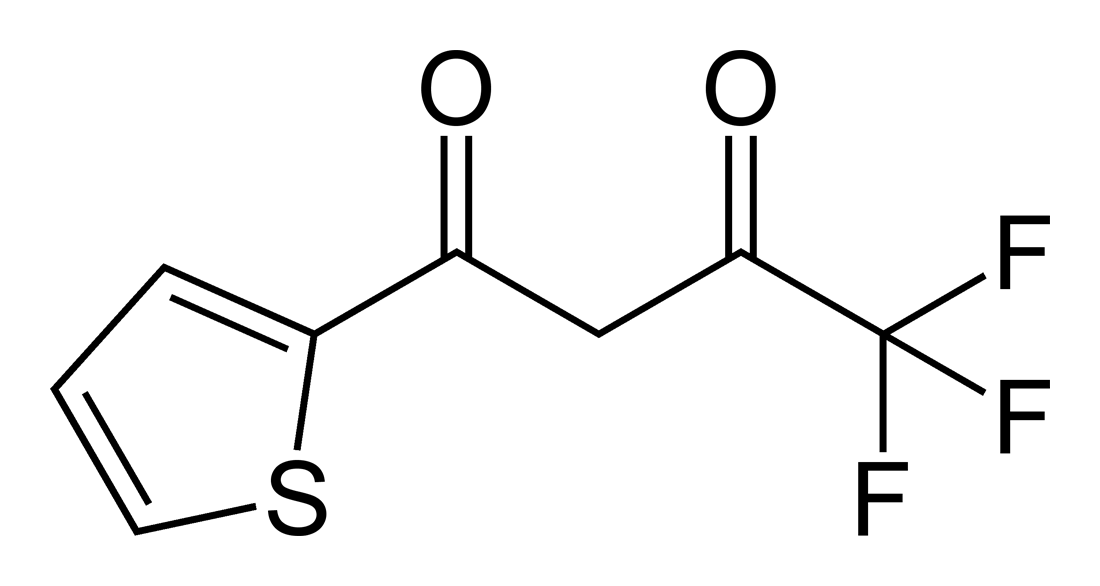

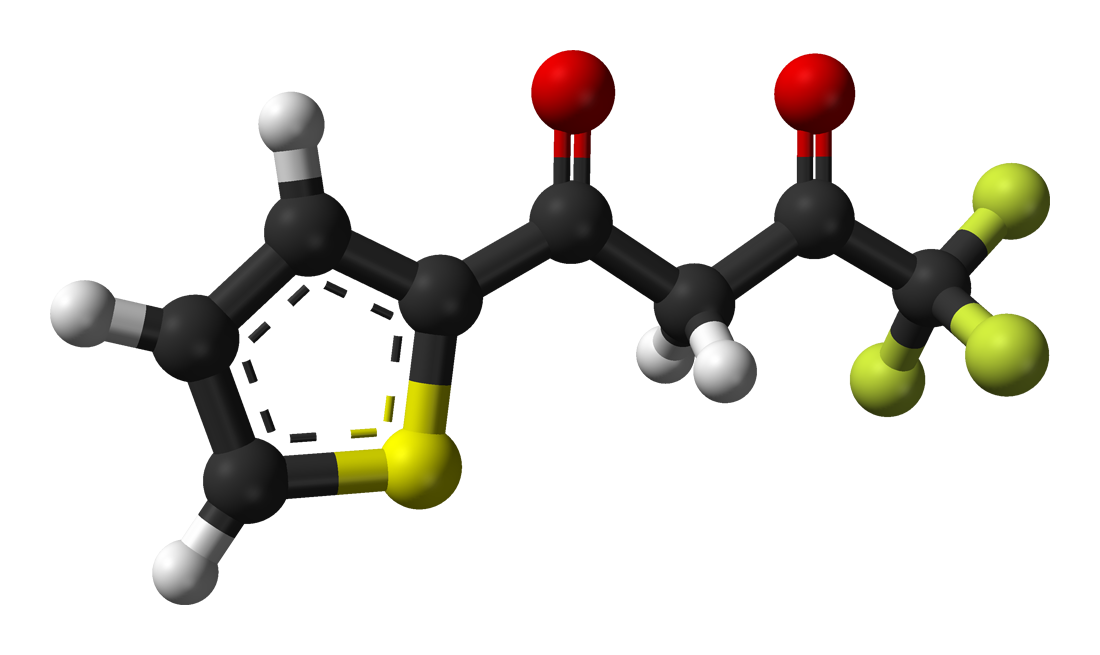

Names
- Preferred IUPAC name 4,4,4-Trifluoro-1-(thiophen-2-yl)butane-1,3-dione
- Other names 2-thenoyltrifluoroacetone

Identifiers
CAS Number	326-91-0
3D model (JSmol)	Interactive image
Abbreviations	TTFA
ChEMBL	ChEMBL1236433
ChemSpider	5399
DrugBank	DB04795
ECHA InfoCard	100.005.743
EC Number	206-316-7
PubChem CID	5601
UNII	MYQ9MNW7NI
CompTox Dashboard (EPA)	DTXSID1059812
- InChI: InChI=1S/C8H5F3O2S/c9-8(10,11)7(13)4-5(12)6-2-1-3-14-6/h1-3H,4H2 Key: TXBBUSUXYMIVOS-UHFFFAOYSA-N; InChI=1/C8H5F3O2S/c9-8(10,11)7(13)4-5(12)6-2-1-3-14-6/h1-3H,4H2 Key: TXBBUSUXYMIVOS-UHFFFAOYAR
- SMILES: O=C(c1sccc1)CC(=O)C(F)(F)F

Properties
Chemical formula	C_{8}H_{5}F_{3}O_{2}S
Molar mass	222.18 g mol^{−1}
Appearance	fine, slightly yellow crystals
Melting point	40 to 44 °C (104 to 111 °F; 313 to 317 K)
Boiling point	96 to 98 °C (205 to 208 °F; 369 to 371 K) 8 mmHg

Hazards
- GHS labelling
Pictograms	(GHS07: Exclamation mark)
Signal word	Warning
Hazard statements	H315, H319, H335
Flash point	12 °C (54 °F; 285 K) (closed cup)
- Except where otherwise noted, data are given for materials in their standard state (at 25 °C [77 °F], 100 kPa). verify (what is ?) Infobox references

Thenoyltrifluoroacetone (TTFA) is a chemical compound with the molecular formula C_{8}H_{5}F_{3}O_{2}S. It is used pharmacologically as a chelating agent. It is an inhibitor of cellular respiration by blocking the respiratory chain at complex II.

The first report of TTFA as an inhibitor of respiration was by A. L. Tappel in 1960. Tappel had the erroneous idea that inhibitors such as antimycin and alkyl hydroxyquinoline-N-oxide might work by chelating iron in the hydrophobic milieu of respiratory membrane proteins, so he tested a series of hydrophobic chelating agents. TTFA was a potent inhibitor, but not because of its chelating ability. TTFA binds at the quinone reduction site in Complex II, preventing ubiquinone from binding. The first x-ray structure of Complex II showing how TTFA binds was published in 2005.

Thenoyltrifluoroacetone can be made in by Claisen condensation of ethyl trifluoroacetate and 2-acetylthiophene.
