= Oxidation with dioxiranes =

Oxidation with dioxiranes refers to the introduction of oxygen into organic substrates using dioxiranes. Dioxiranes are well known for epoxidations (synthesis of epoxides from alkenes). Dioxiranes oxidize other unsaturated functionality, heteroatoms, and alkane C-H bonds. Dioxiranes are metal-free oxidants.

== Epoxidations ==
Dioxiranes are electrophilic oxidants that react more quickly with electron-rich than electron-poor double bonds; however, both classes of substrates can be epoxidized within a reasonable time frame. The mechanism of epoxidation with dioxiranes likely involves concerted oxygen transfer through a spiro transition state. As oxygen transfer occurs, the plane of the oxirane is perpendicular to and bisects the plane of the alkene pi system. The configuration of the alkene is maintained in the product, ruling out long-lived radical intermediates. In addition, the spiro transition state has been used to explain the selectivity in enantioselective epoxidations with chiral ketones.

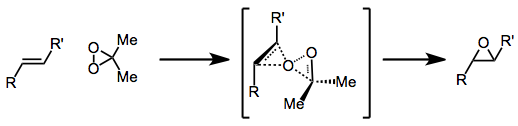

Diastereoselective epoxidation may be achieved through the use of alkene starting materials with diastereotopic faces. When racemic 3-isopropylcyclohexene was subjected to DMD oxidation, the trans epoxide, which resulted from attack on the less hindered face of the double bond, was the major product.

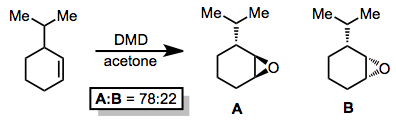

Epoxidations of electron-rich double bonds yield intermediates of Rubottom oxidation. Upon hydrolysis, these siloxyepoxides yield α-hydroxyketones.

Electron-poor double bonds take much longer to epoxidize. Heating may be used to encourage oxidation, although the reaction temperature should never exceed 50 °C, to avoid decomposition of the dioxirane

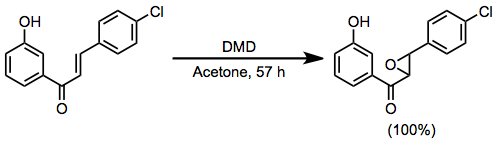

Alkenes bound to both electron-withdrawing and -donating groups tend to behave like the former, requiring long oxidation times and occasionally some heating. Like electron-poor epoxides, epoxide products from this class of substrates are often stable with respect to hydrolysis.

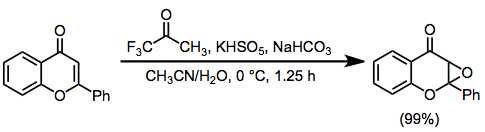

In substrates containing multiple double bonds, the more electron-rich double bond tends to be epoxidized first.

Epoxidations employing aqueous oxone and a catalytic amount of ketone are convenient if a specialized dioxirane must be used (as in asymmetric applications) or if isolation of the dioxirane is inconvenient. Hydrolytic decomposition of the epoxidation product may be used to good advantage.

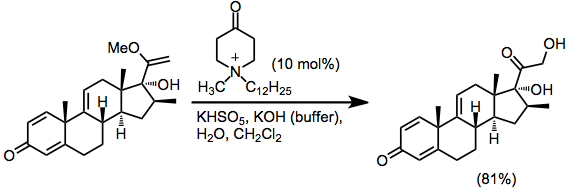

Diastereoselective DMD epoxidation of a chiral unsaturated ketone was applied to the synthesis of verrucosan-2β-ol.

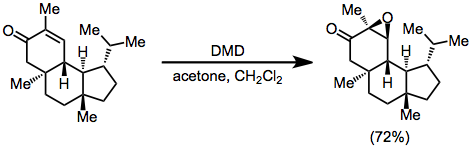

Enantioselective dioxirane epoxidation is critical in a synthetic sequence leading to an analogue of glabrescol. The sequence produced the glabrescol analogue in 31% overall yield in only two steps.

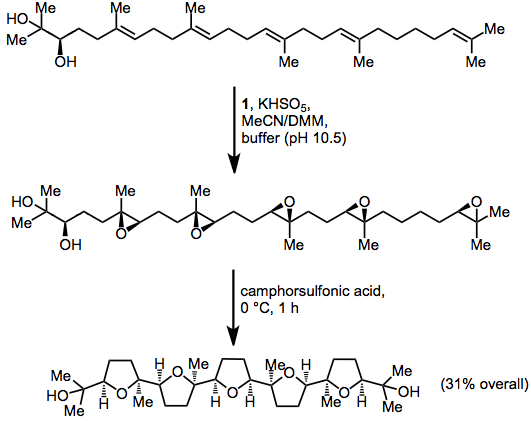

=== Comparison with other methods ===
Dioxirane epoxidation compares favorably to related peracid oxidations. Peracids generate acidic byproducts, meaning that acid-labile substrates and products must be avoided.

Some methods are well-suited to the oxidation of electron-rich or electron-poor double bonds, but few are as effective for both classes of substrate as dioxiranes. Weitz-Scheffer conditions (NaOCl, H_{2}O_{2}/KOH, tBuO_{2}H/KOH) work well for oxidations of electron-poor double bonds, and sulfonyl-substituted oxaziridines are effective for electron-rich double bonds.

Metal-based oxidants are often more efficient than dioxirane oxidations in the catalytic mode; however, environmentally unfriendly byproducts are typically generated. In the realm of asymmetric methods, both the Sharpless epoxidation and Jacobsen epoxidation surpass asymmetric dioxirane oxidations in enantioselectivity. Additionally, enzymatic epoxidations are more enantioselective than dioxirane-based methods; however, such methods often suffer from operational difficulties and low yields.

=== Asymmetric epoxidations with dioxiranes ===
Chiral ketones react with oxone to give chiral dioxiranes. This fact underpins enantioselective epoxidations. A popular implementation is the Shi epoxidation, which uses a fructose-derived chiral ketone.

=== Practical considerations ===
Dioxiranes may be prepared and isolated or generated in situ from ketones and potassium peroxymonosulfate (Oxone). In situ preparations may be catalytic in ketone. The functional group compatibility of dioxiranes is limited somewhat, as side oxidations of amines and sulfides are rapid. Baeyer-Villiger oxidation may compete with dioxirane formation.

Dioxirane itself (CH_{2}O_{2}) is not useful. Instead, the substituted dioxiranes dimethyldioxirane (DMD) and methyl(trifluoromethyl)dioxirane (TFD) are commonly employed for synthesis.

DMD and TFD may be generated in situ using conventional glassware with a two-phase system consisting of a buffered aqueous solution of oxone and a solution of substrate in an organic solvent. Such a two-phase set up is called for since oxone is insoluble in organic solvents. Mechanical stirring and/or polar organic solvents such as acetone are employed often.

The salt KHSO_{5} is often referred to as oxone, but they are not the same. Oxone refers to the triple salt 2KHSO_{5}·KHSO_{4}·K_{2}SO_{4}, which is more shelf-stable than KHSO_{5}.

Epoxidations using isolated dioxirane (e.g. DMD or TFD) avoid the need for aqueous buffering. The volatile dioxiranes DMD and TFD can be isolated via distillation. Once isolated, dioxiranes can be kept in solutions of the corresponding ketones and dried with molecular sieves. These solutions are suitable when substrates or products are sensitive to hydrolysis. Catalytic dioxirane oxidations do, however, require water.

== Other oxidations with dioxiranes ==
Dioxiranes oxidize a wide variety of functional groups yielding epoxides or other oxidized products. Oxidation of allenes affords allene dioxides or products of intramolecular participation.(6)

The oxidations of heteroaromatic compounds can depend on conditions. Thus, at low temperatures, acetylated indoles are simply epoxidized in high yield (unprotected indoles undergo N-oxidation). However, when the temperature is raised to 0 °C, rearranged products are obtained.

(7)

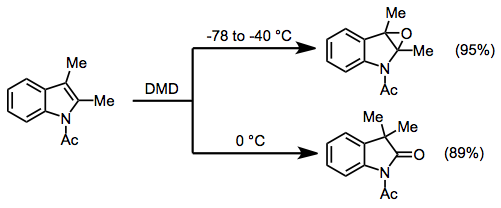

DMD may oxidize heteroatoms to the corresponding oxides (or products of oxide decomposition). Often, the results of these oxidations depend on reaction conditions. Tertiary amines cleanly give the corresponding N-oxides. Primary amines give nitroalkanes upon treatment with 4 equivalents of DMD, but azoxy compounds upon treatment with only 2 equivalents. Secondary amines afford either hydroxylamines or nitrones.

(8)

Sulfide oxidation in the presence of a single equivalent of DMD leads to sulfoxides. Increasing the amount of DMD used (2 or more equivalents) leads to sulfones. Both nitrogen and sulfur are more susceptible to oxidation than carbon-carbon multiple bonds.

(10)

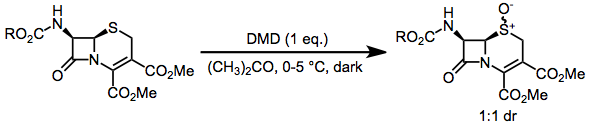

Although alkanes are typically difficult to functionalize directly, C-H insertion with TFD is an efficient process in many cases. The order of reactivity of C-H bonds is: allylic > benzylic > tertiary > secondary > primary. Often, the intermediate alcohols produced are oxidized further to carbonyl compounds, although this can be prevented by trapping in situ with an anhydride. Chiral alkanes are functionalized with retention of configuration.

(11)

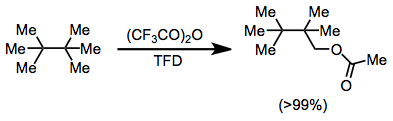

Dioxiranes oxidize primary alcohols to either the aldehyde or carboxylic acid; however, DMD selectively oxidizes secondary over primary alcohols. Thus, vicinal diols may be transformed into α-hydroxy ketones with dioxirane oxidation.

(12)

Epoxidation is usually more facile than C-H oxidation, although sterically hindered allyl groups may undergo selective C-H oxidation instead of epoxidation of the allylic double bond.

=== Comparison with heteroatom oxidation reagents ===
A variety of alternative heteroatom oxidation reagents are known, including peroxides (often employed with a transition metal catalyst) and oxaziridines. These reagents do not suffer from the over-oxidation problems and decomposition issues associated with dioxiranes. Their substrate scope, however, tends to be more limited. Nucleophilic decomposition of dioxiranes to singlet oxygen is uniquely prolem associated with dioxirane heteroatom oxidations on the other hand. Although chiral dioxiranes do not provide the same levels of enantioselectivity as other protocols, such as Kagan's sulfoxidation system, complexation to a chiral transition metal complex followed by oxidation affords optically active sulfoxides with good enantioselectivity.

Oxidation of arenes and cumulenes leads initially to epoxides. These substrates are resistant to many epoxidation reagents, including oxaziridines, hydrogen peroxide, and manganese oxo compounds. Organometallic oxidants also react sluggishly with these compounds, with the exception of methyltrioxorhenium. Peracids also react with arenes and cumulenes, but cannot be employed with substrates containing acid-sensitive functionality.
