= Oxone =

- 2(K^{+}HSO^{−}_{5})·K^{+}HSO^{−}_{4}·(K^{+})_{2}SO^{2−}_{4}

Names
- IUPAC name Potassium peroxysulfate-potassium sulfate-potassium bisulfate

Identifiers
CAS Number	70693-62-8; 37222-66-5
3D model (JSmol)	Interactive image
ChemSpider	26943821
EC Number	274-778-7; 609-357-2
PubChem CID	15793144
UNII	HL6A2XXU5D
- InChI: InChI=1S/5K.2H2O5S.2H2O4S/c;;;;;2*1-5-6(2,3)4;2*1-5(2,3)4/h;;;;;2*1H,(H,2,3,4);2*(H2,1,2,3,4)/q5*+1;;;;/p-5 Key: HJKYXKSLRZKNSI-UHFFFAOYSA-I
- SMILES: OS(=O)(=O)[O-].OS(=O)(=O)O[O-].OS(=O)(=O)O[O-].[O-]S(=O)(=O)[O-].[K+].[K+].[K+].[K+].[K+]

Properties
Chemical formula	H_{3}K_{5}O_{18}S_{4}
Molar mass	614.76 g/mol
Appearance	white solid
Melting point	250 °C (482 °F; 523 K) (Decomposes)
Solubility in water	25-30 % (w/v) at 22 °C

Hazards
- Occupational safety and health (OHS/OSH)
Main hazards	Oxidant, corrosive
- GHS labelling
Pictograms	(GHS05: Corrosive) (GHS07: Exclamation mark)
Signal word	Danger
Hazard statements	H302, H314, H412
Precautionary statements	P273, P280, P301+P330+P331, P303+P361+P353, P305+P351+P338, P310
NFPA 704 (fire diamond)	3 0 1
Safety data sheet (SDS)	ECHA

Related compounds
Related compounds	Potassium persulfate
- Except where otherwise noted, data are given for materials in their standard state (at 25 °C [77 °F], 100 kPa). Infobox references

Oxone is the triple salt 2KHSO_{5}·KHSO_{4}·K_{2}SO_{4}. For almost all applications, the active ingredient in this compound is potassium peroxymonosulfate, KHSO_{5}. The triple salt has a longer shelf-life than potassium peroxymonosulfate, but releases the same peroxymonosulfate anion upon dissolution.

One advantage of oxone from an industrial point of view is that its dangerous goods classification tends to be Corrosive (Class 8) rather than Oxidising (Class 5). This makes it easier and cheaper to transport compared to other persulfate salts.

== Synthesis and structure ==
The triple salt is produced via peroxysulfuric acid, which is generated in situ from sulfuric acid (oleum) and hydrogen peroxide and reacted with potassium hydroxide. X-ray crystallography confirms the triple salt formulation, revealing hydrogen-bonding network that entraps the persulfate anion. The O-O distance is 1.458(2) Å, as found in H_{2}O_{2}.

The purity of Oxone can be determined by iodometric titration. Heavy metal salts catalyze the decomposition of the title compound, based on reporting on its triple salt formulation. An estimated 43-45% of it, by weight, of which 5.2% active oxygen is theoretically possible, and 4.7% was typically observed. In 2012, a review was reporting the KHSO_{5} estimate to be "about 50% per mole" of triple salt.) The stability advantage notwithstanding (see following), methods were developed to deliver a forms of the title compound that required smaller amounts in reactions, and this was achieved on large scale in 2002 via preparations of purified KHSO_{5}·H_{2}O.

== Uses ==
Underlying the uses of Oxone is the highly positive oxidation potential for peroxymonosulfate, which is +1.81 V.

=== Cleaning ===
Oxone-type products are used for oxidative processes that result in decomposition of organic contaminants, and therefore in cleaning, whitening, and disinfection. For instance, it can be used to whiten materials used in dental health practices, to clean materials in the manufacture of microelectronics, and decontaminate recreational water pools. Use of formulations containing the title compound in pool water quality management can interfere with determinations of chlorination assay, using a standard ferrous ammonium sulfate, N,N′-diethyl-p-phenylenediamine (FAS-DPD) method, if added reagents and steps are not followed to neutralise the KMPS (potassium monopersulfate / peroxymonosulfate).

=== Preparative chemistry ===
Oxone is a versatile oxidant in organic chemistry. It oxidizes terminal alkenes to epoxides. It converts internal alkenes into two equivalents of carboxylic acid. Oxone convert aldehydes to carboxylic acids. When such reactions are conducted in the presence of alcoholic solvents, the corresponding esters may be obtained.

Oxone converts ketones to dioxiranes, which can be used for diverse oxidations in organic synthesis. and in the oxidation of other unsaturated functionalities, heteroatoms, and even some alkane C-H bonds.

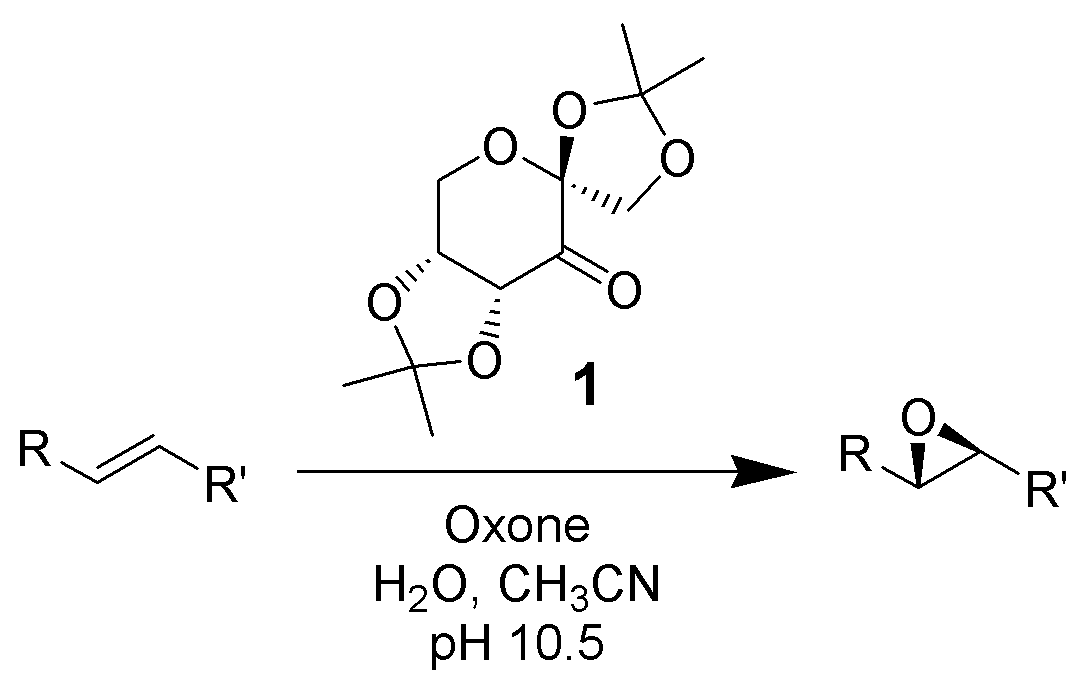
The Shi epoxidation

Oxone is used in the production of some organic periodinanes, notably the oxidation of 2-iodobenzoic acid to 2-iodoxybenzoic acid (IBX).

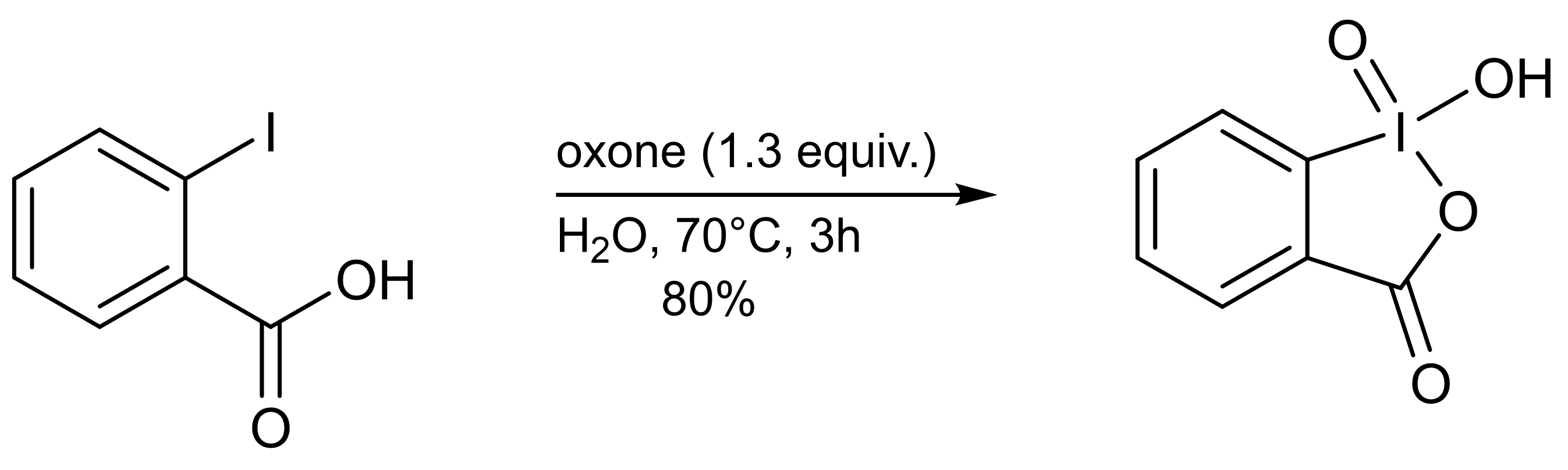
Oxidation of 2-iodobenzoic acid to IBX

Peroxymonosulfate-driven conversions can be used with sulfides and selenides to prepare sulfones and selenones, with anilines and amino sugars to provide nitro compounds, oximes to provide nitro compounds (in aqueous buffered conditions) or to return the parent carbonyl compounds (in the presence of alumina, with microwave heating), primary and secondary amines to provide hydroxylamines (using adsorbed Oxone) or N-nitrosation products (in the presence of sodium nitrite), pyridines and tertiary amines to provide amine oxides, and phosphorus(III) compounds to provide phosphono-compounds largely retaining configuration at phosphorus (with comparable outcomes when a sulfur or selenium atom replaces the phosphorus(III) lone pair).

Examples of preparative scale oxidatives of these types are the conversion of an acridine derivative to the corresponding acridine-N-oxide, and the synthesis of fluoromethyl phenyl sulfone, a reagent used in the synthesis of fluoroalkenes.

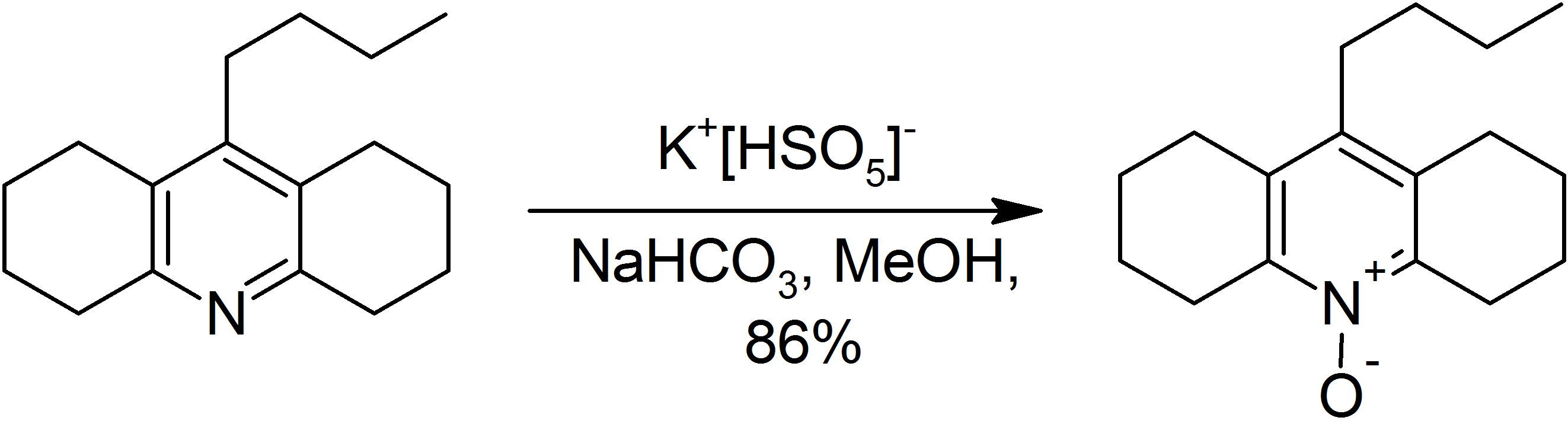

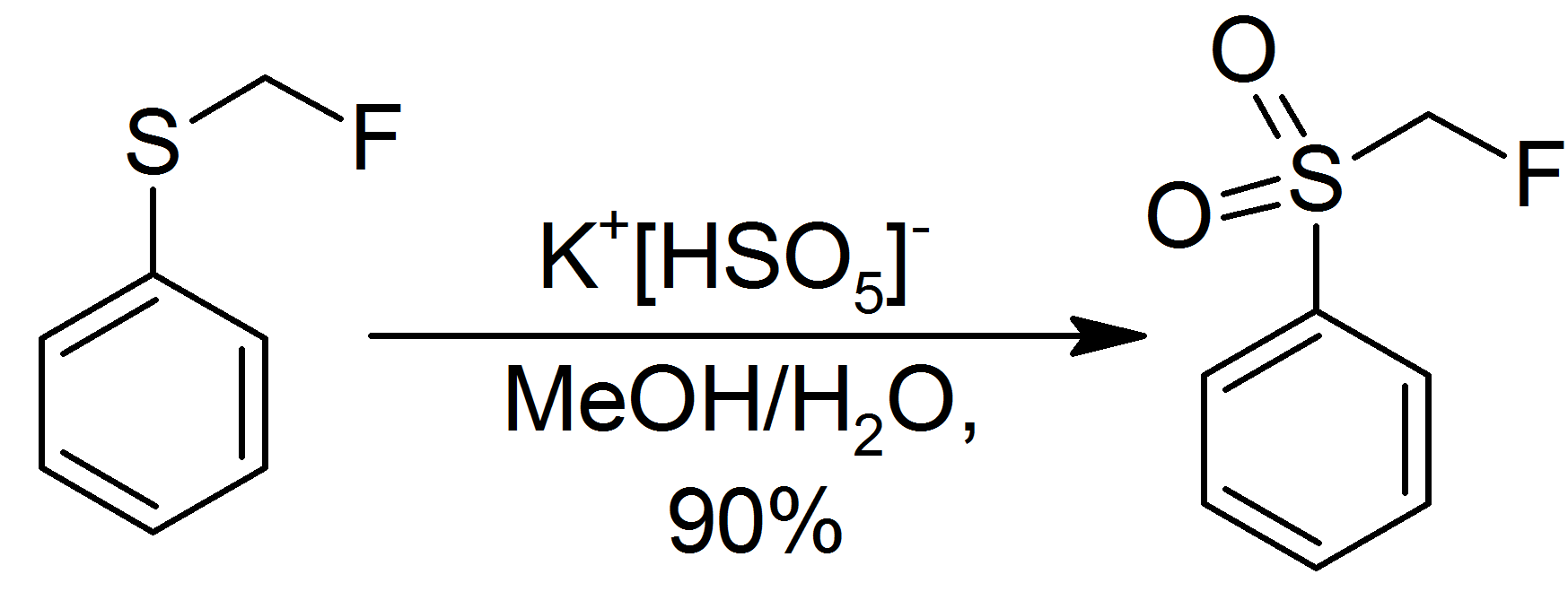
