= Potassium peroxymonosulfate =

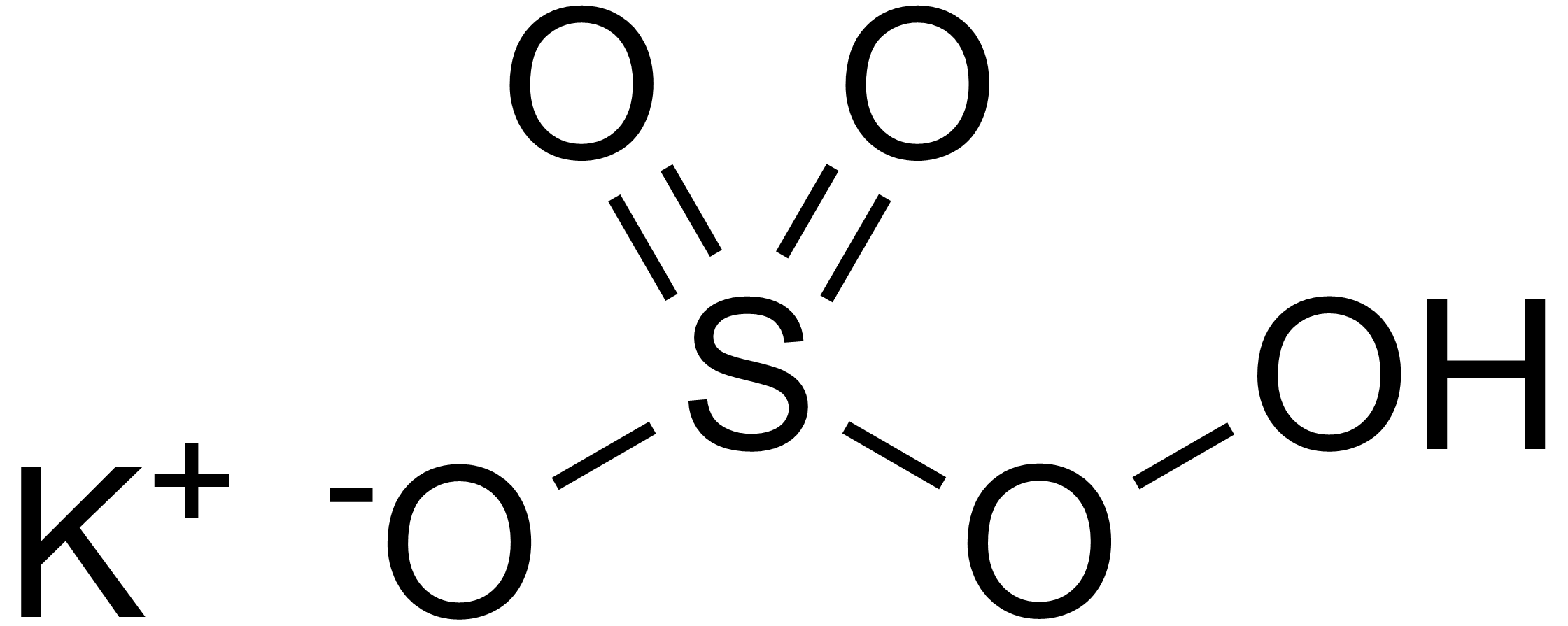

Names
- IUPAC name Potassium peroxysulfate

Identifiers
CAS Number	10058-23-8
3D model (JSmol)	Interactive image
ChemSpider	8053100
ECHA InfoCard	100.030.158
PubChem CID	11804954
UNII	040ZB27861
CompTox Dashboard (EPA)	DTXSID1034840
- InChI: InChI=1S/K.H2O5S/c;1-5-6(2,3)4/h;1H,(H,2,3,4)/q+1;/p-1 Key: OKBMCNHOEMXPTM-UHFFFAOYSA-M; InChI=1S/K.H2O4S/c;1-4-5(2)3/h;1H,(H,2,3)/q+1;/p-1; Key: GZHFEBOLZPYNER-UHFFFAOYSA-M; InChI=1/K.H2O5S/c;1-5-6(2,3)4/h;1H,(H,2,3,4)/q+1;/p-1 Key: OKBMCNHOEMXPTM-REWHXWOFAJ
- SMILES: [K+].[O-]S(=O)(=O)OO

Properties
Chemical formula	KHSO_{5}
Molar mass	152.2 g/mol
Appearance	white solid

Hazards
- Occupational safety and health (OHS/OSH)
Main hazards	Oxidant, corrosive
NFPA 704 (fire diamond)	3 0 1
Safety data sheet (SDS)	ChemicalBook.com SDS

Related compounds
Related compounds	Potassium persulfate
- Except where otherwise noted, data are given for materials in their standard state (at 25 °C [77 °F], 100 kPa). verify (what is ?) Infobox references

Potassium peroxymonosulfate, also referred to as potassium peroxysulfate and potassium monopersulfate (KMPS), is an inorganic compound with the formula KHSO_{5}. It is the mono-potassium salt derived from peroxymonosulfuric acid (Caro's acid). It is a constituent of the widely used oxidizing agent called Oxone, which is a triple salt with the formula 2KHSO_{5}·KHSO_{4}·K_{2}SO_{4}.

== Related salts ==
Organic-soluble derivatives of peroxymonosulfate include the tetra-n-butylammonium, tetraphenylphosphonium, and benzyltriphenylphosphonium salts: (nBu_{4}N)HSO_{5}, (Ph_{4}P)HSO_{5}, and (BnPh_{3}P)HSO_{5}. The ammonium and sodium salts of HSO^{−}_{5} are also known.

== Applications ==
The title compound is the active ingredient in oxone, which is a common disinfectant and whitening agent. It has also been investigated for use in processes aimed at delignification of wood.

Underlying these uses is the high redox potential, which for potassium peroxymonosulfate, per se, is +1.81 V.

== Structure ==
The structure of the monohydrate has been confirmed by X-ray crystallography. This analysis reveals the expected tetrahedral sulfur center, an O-O bond length of 146 picometers, and an SOOH dihedral angle of 90°.
