= Ethyl trifluoroacetate =

Identifiers
| CAS Number | 383-63-1 |
| 3D model (JSmol) | Interactive image |
| ChEBI | CHEBI:192463 |
| ChEMBL | ChEMBL3185188 |
| ChemSpider | 9411 |
| ECHA InfoCard | 100.006.229 |
| EC Number | 206-851-6 |
| PubChem CID | 9794 |
| UNII | A6TZK6X11X |
| CompTox Dashboard (EPA) | DTXSID8041959 |
- InChI: InChI=1S/C4H5F3O2/c1-2-9-3(8)4(5,6)7/h2H2,1H3 Key: STSCVKRWJPWALQ-UHFFFAOYSA-N
- SMILES: CCOC(=O)C(F)(F)F

Properties
| Chemical formula | C_{4}H_{5}F_{3}O_{2} |
| Molar mass | 142.077 g·mol^{−1} |
| Density | 1.1952 g/cm^{3} (16.7 °C) |
| Boiling point | 61 °C (142 °F; 334 K) |
- Except where otherwise noted, data are given for materials in their standard state (at 25 °C [77 °F], 100 kPa). Infobox references

Ethyl trifluoroacetate is a chemical compound from the trifluoroacetate group.

== Production ==
Ethyl trifluoroacetate can be obtained by reacting 2,4,6-tris-(trifluoromethyl)-1,3,5-triazine with ethanol in the presence of hydrochloric acid. The former, in turn, can be prepared by a two-step reaction starting from trichloroacetonitrile by reaction with hydrogen chloride and fluorination of the intermediate with antimony trifluoride.

The compound can also be obtained by reacting trifluoroacetic acid or sodium trifluoroacetate with ethanol.

== Properties ==
Ethyl trifluoroacetate is a colorless and odorless liquid that is sparingly soluble in water but miscible with chloroform and methanol. The compound exists in the gas phase in two more conformal forms.

== Use ==
Ethyl trifluoroacetate is used as an intermediate in organic synthesis to prepare organic fluorine compounds such as 3-ethyl-1-methylimidazolium trifluoroacetate (EMITA). It is also used in the synthesis of various pharmaceutically active molecules and agricultural products, and is also useful for the preparation of trifluoroacetylated compounds. The trifluoroacetyl group is widely used as an amine protecting group in organic synthesis because it can be easily removed under mild conditions.
