= Shi epoxidation =

Chemical reaction

| Named after | Yian Shi |
| Reaction type | Ring forming reaction |

Identifiers
| Organic Chemistry Portal | shi-epoxidation |
| RSC ontology ID | RXNO:0000687 |

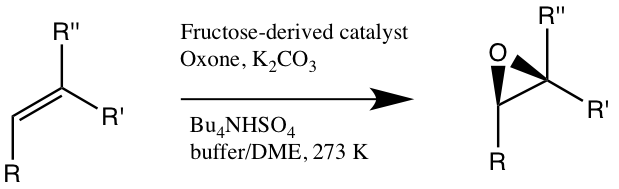
Shi epoxidation with modern reaction conditions

The Shi epoxidation is a chemical reaction, as the asymmetric epoxidation of alkenes with oxone (potassium peroxymonosulfate) and a fructose-derived catalyst (1). This reaction is thought to proceed via a dioxirane intermediate, generated when the oxone peroxidizes the catalyst ketone. (The oxone sulfate group facilitates dioxirane formation by acting as a good leaving group during ring closure.) Its non-metal catalyst represents an early example of organocatalysis.

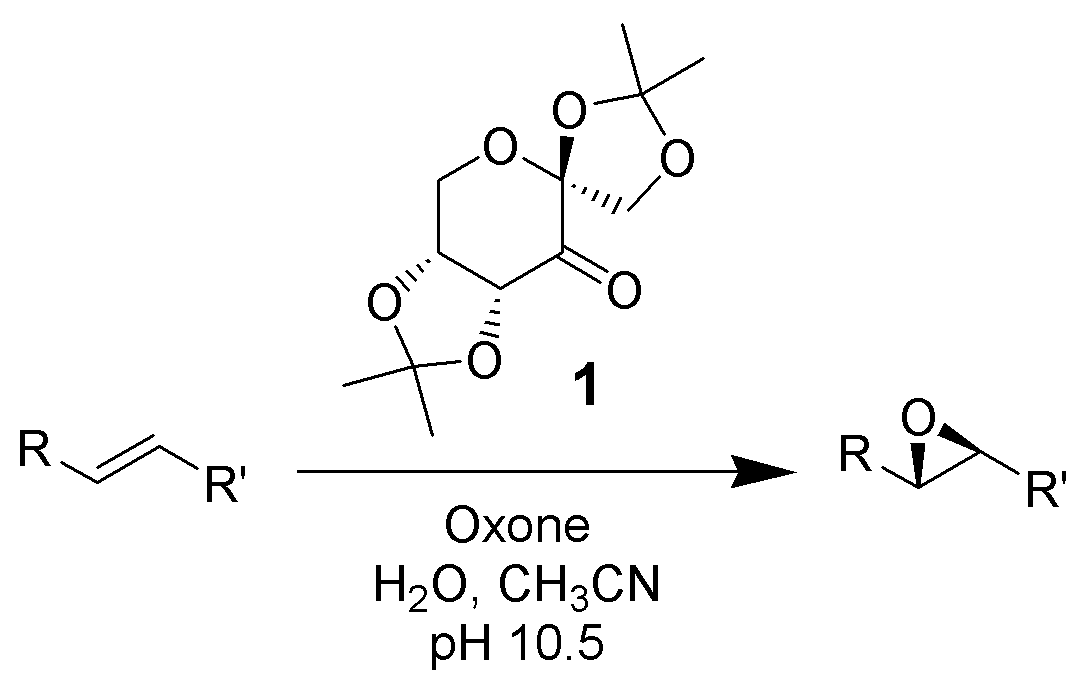
The Shi epoxidation

== History ==
The reaction was first reported by Yian Shi (史一安, pinyin: Shǐ Yī-ān) is derived from D-fructose and has a stereogenic center close to the reacting center (ketone)- the rigid six-membered ring structure of the catalyst and adjacent quaternary ring group minimizes epimerization of this stereocenter. Oxidation by the active dioxirane catalyst takes place from the si-face, due to steric hindrance of the opposing re-face. This catalyst functions efficiently as an asymmetric catalyst for unfunctionalized trans-olefins.

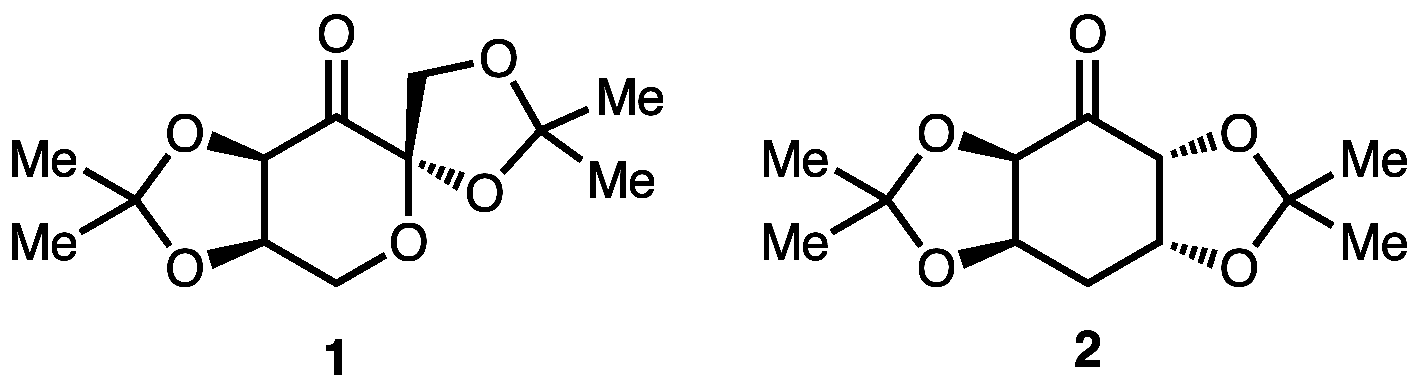

== Dioxirane catalyst formation ==
Under normal pH conditions, an excess of 3 stoichiometric amounts of ketone catalyst are needed due to a high rate of decomposition. At basic pH conditions greater than 10 (pH 10.5) substoichiometric amounts (0.2–0.3) are needed for epoxidations, lowering the decomposition of reagents by disfavoring the Baeyer-Villiger side reaction. Higher temperatures result in further decomposition; thus a low temperature of zero degrees Celsius is used.

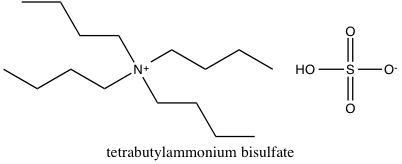
Phase transfer catalyst used in epoxidation

Decomposition of reagents is bimolecular (second-order reaction rate), so low amounts of oxone and catalyst are used.

The reaction is mediated by a D-fructose derived catalyst, which produces the (R,R) enantiomer of the resulting epoxide. Solubilities of olefin organic substrate and oxidant (oxone) differ, and thus a biphasic medium is needed. The generation of the active catalyst species takes place in the aqueous layer, and is shuttled to the organic layer with the reactants by tetrabutylammonium sulfate. The ketone catalyst is continuously regenerated in a catalytic cycle, and thus can catalyze the epoxidation in small amounts.

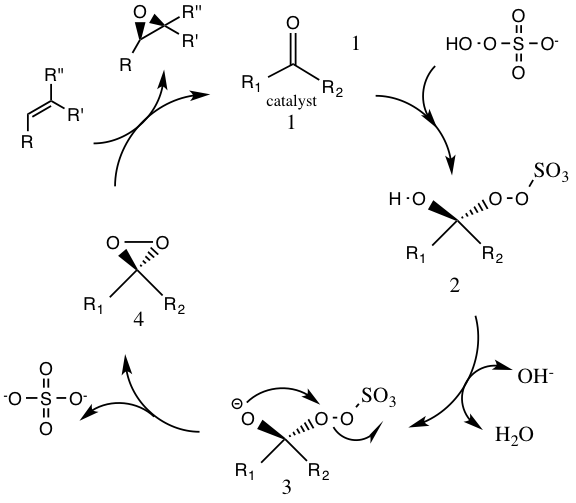
Cycle showing generation of dioxirane and its reaction with alkene substrate.

The first step in the catalytic cycle reaction is the nucleophilic addition reaction of the oxone with the ketone group on the catalyst (intermediate 1). This forms the reactive intermediate number 2 species, the Criegee intermediate that can potentially lead to unwanted side reactions, such as the Baeyer-Villiger reaction (see below). The generation of intermediate species number 3 occurs under basic conditions, with a removal of the hydrogen from the hydroxy group to form a nucleophilic oxygen anion. The sulfate group facilitates the subsequent formation of the dioxirane, intermediate species number 4, by acting as a good leaving group during the 3-exo-tet cyclization. The activated dioxirane catalytic species then transfers an oxygen atom to the alkene, leading to a regeneration of the original catalyst.

=== Side reactions ===
A potential side reaction that may occur is the Baeyer-Villiger reaction of intermediate 2, where there is a rearrangement of the peroxy group that results in the formation of the relative ester. The extent of this side reaction declines with the rise of pH, and increases the nucleophilicity of the oxone, making basic conditions favorable for the overall epoxidation and reactivity of the catalytic species.

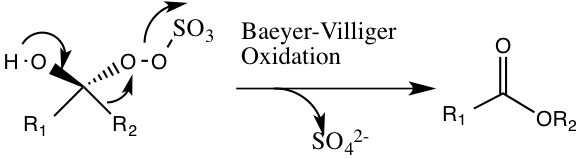
Formation of side products from Criegee intermediate. The side reaction results in the loss of a sulfate anion and formation of an ester species.

== Epoxidation mechanisms ==
The oxygen from the dioxirane group generated on the organic catalyst is transferred to the alkene, in what is thought to be a concerted mechanism, although the presence of an oxygen anion intermediate through an S_{n}2 mechanism may transpire.

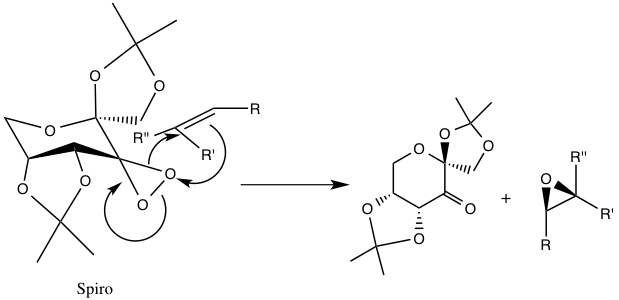
Dioxirane transfer

== Preparation of D-fructose derivative ==
The catalyst is formed by reaction with acetone under basic conditions, with the hydroxyl groups of the fructose ring acting as nucleophiles, their nucleophilicity increased by the basic conditions created by potassium carbonate. The electron withdrawing substituents (alpha-ether groups) encourage the formation of the ketone from the oxidizing agent pyridinium chlorochromate by increasing the electrophilicity of the carbonyl carbon, via a stabilizing delocalization of the forming π C-C bonds into the σ* C-O bonds of the adjacent ethers.

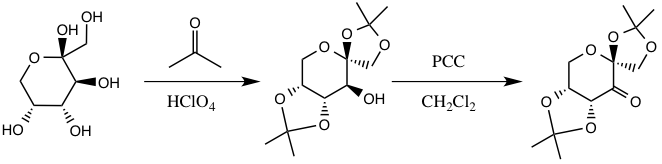
Preparation of catalyst (precursor to reactive species)

Enantioselective dioxirane oxidations may rely on chiral, non-racemic dioxiranes, such as Shi's fructose-based dioxirane. Enantioselective oxidation of meso-diols with Shi's catalyst, for instance, produces chiral α-hydroxy ketones with moderate enantioselectivity.

(4)

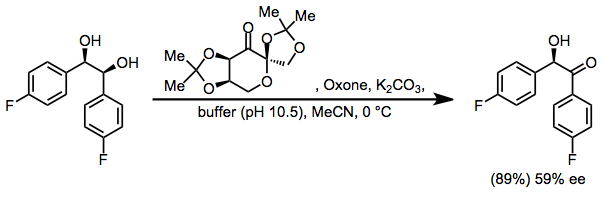

== Transition states and enantiomeric selectivity ==
There are two proposed transition states, whose geometries are speculated and not corroborated by experimental evidence, but are attributed to stereoelectronic effects. The spiro transition state is favored over the planar due to the non-bonding orbitals of the superior oxygen donating into the π* anti-bonding C-C orbitals of the reacting alkene, providing a stabilizing delocalization of electrons.

Donation of these electrons into the forming C-O σ bonds of the epoxide bonds also encourages the formation of the spiro-product (the geometry of the product is aligned as well). The planar configuration is disfavored due to lack of pi-backbonding and steric hindrance of the alkyl groups with large alkyl functional groups of the catalytic ring.

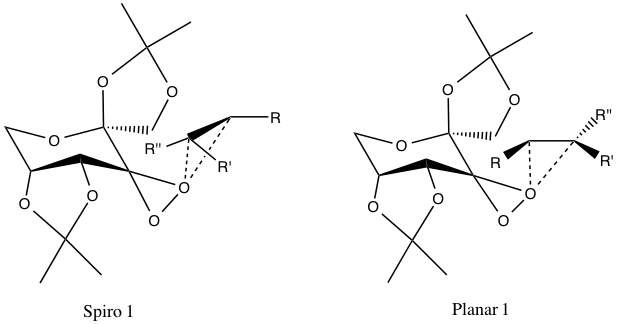
Favored spiro and planar transition states of tri-substituted olefins

The previously mentioned configurations are favored over the transition states of the opposing enantiomers because of unfavorable steric interactions between the R-alkyl groups (see below) and the ether-alkyl functional groups of the catalyst ring.

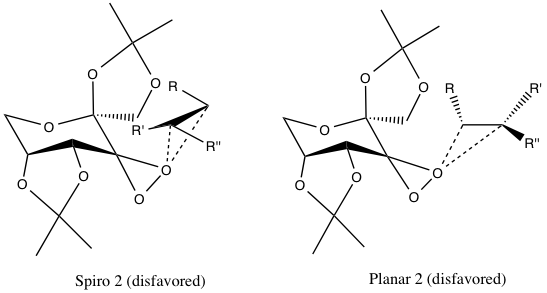
Disfavored spiro and planar transition state configurations

The enantiomeric success of this epoxidation is relatively high compared to metal catalysts, and generally results in a high enantiomeric excess exceeding 80 percent.

== Reaction yield and stereoselectivity ==
This procedure generates epoxides with high enantiomeric excesses from trans-disubstituted alkenes and trisubstituted alkenes. Cis-disubstituted alkenes and styrenes are asymmetrically epoxidized using a similar catalyst. Generation of (R,R) epoxides from corresponding alkenes increases in stereoselectivity with increased steric bulk of substituent R groups (especially in trans-olefins).

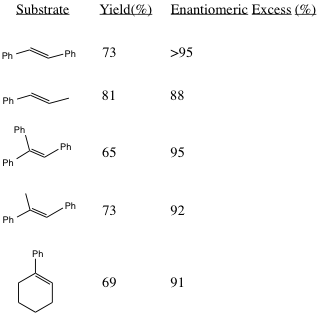
Examples of olefin yields

== See also ==
- Sharpless epoxidation
