= Peroxyoxalate =

Peroxyoxalates are esters initially formed by the reaction of hydrogen peroxide with oxalate diesters or oxalyl chloride, with or without a base, although the reaction is faster with base. However, they are intermediates that will rapidly transform into 1,2-dioxetanedione, another high-energy intermediate. The likely mechanism of 1,2-dioxetanedione formation from peroxyoxalate in base is illustrated below:

The reaction mechanism.

As seen above, 1,2-Dioxetanedione will rapidly decompose into carbon dioxide (CO_{2}). If there is no fluorescer present, only heat will be released. However, in the presence of a fluorescer, light can be generated (chemiluminescence).

Peroxyoxalate chemiluminescence (CL) was first reported by Rauhut in 1967 in the reaction of diphenyl oxalate. The emission is generated by the reaction of an oxalate ester with hydrogen peroxide in the presence of a suitably fluorescent energy acceptor. This reaction is used in glow sticks.

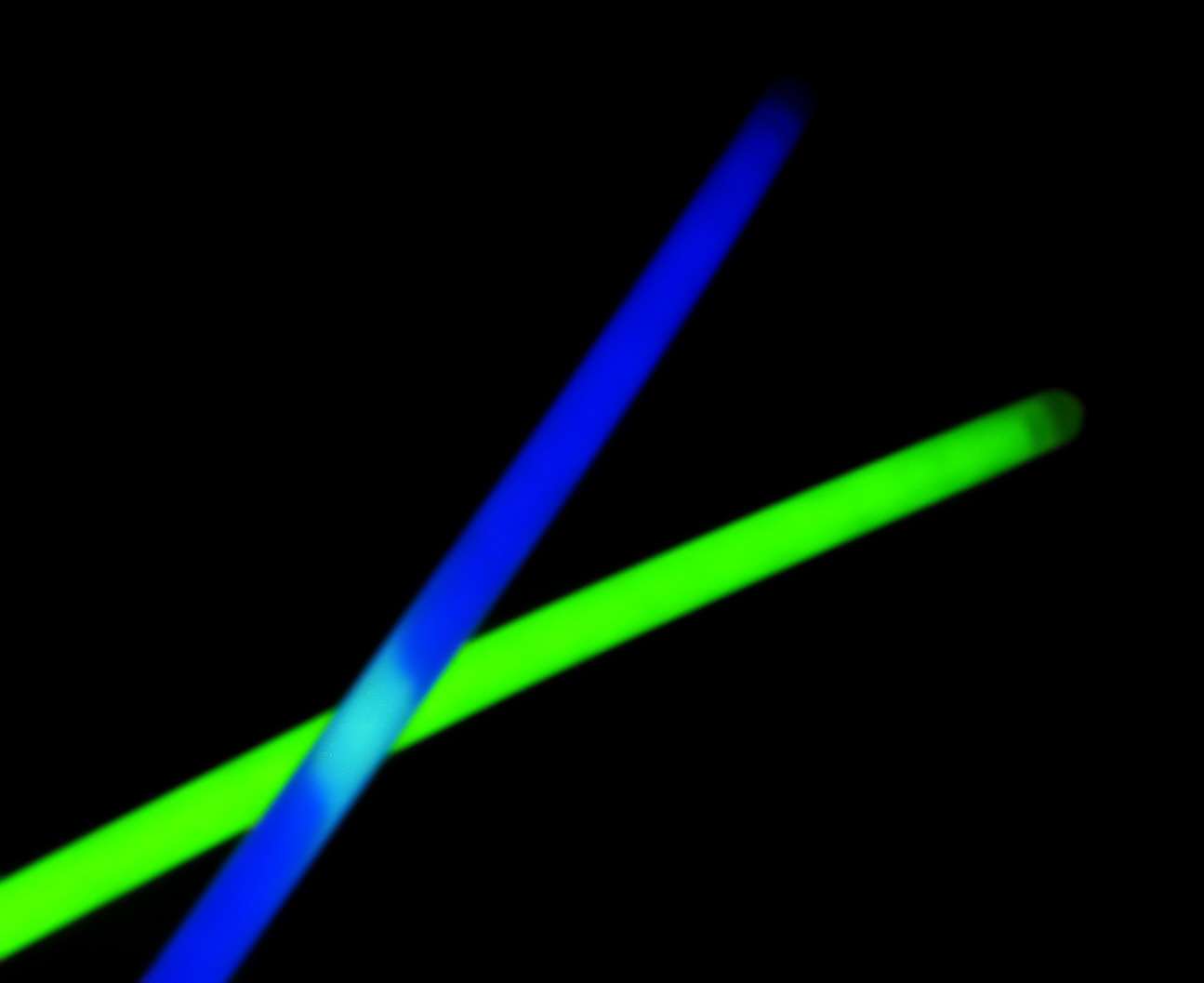
Glow sticks using peroxyoxalate CL

The three most widely used oxalates are bis(2,4,6-trichlorophenyl)oxalate (TCPO), Bis(2,4,5-trichlorophenyl-6-carbopentoxyphenyl)oxalate (CPPO) and bis(2,4-dinitrophenyl) oxalate (DNPO). Other aryl oxalates have been synthesized and evaluated with respect to their possible analytical applications. Divanillyl oxalate, a more eco-friendly or "green" oxalate for chemiluminescence, decomposes into the nontoxic, biodegradable compound vanillin and works in nontoxic, biodegradable triacetin. Peroxyoxalate CL is an example of indirect or sensitized chemiluminescence in which the energy from an excited intermediate is transferred to a suitable fluorescent molecule, which relaxes to the ground state by emitting a photon. Rauhut and co-workers have reported that the intermediate responsible for providing the energy of excitation is 1,2-dioxetanedione. The peroxyoxalate reaction is able to excite many different compounds, having emissions spanning the visible and infrared regions of the spectrum, and the reaction can supply up to 440 kJ mol-1, corresponding to excitation at 272 nm. It has been found, however, that the chemiluminescence intensity corrected for quantum yield decreases as the singlet excitation energy of the fluorescent molecule increases. There is also a linear relationship between the corrected chemiluminescence intensity and the oxidation potential of the molecule. This suggests the possibility of an electron transfer step in the mechanism, as demonstrated in several other chemiluminescence systems. It has been postulated that a transient charge transfer complex is formed between the intermediate 1,2-dioxetanedione and the fluorescer, and a modified mechanism was proposed involving the transfer of an electron from the fluorescer to the reactive intermediate. The emission of light is thought to result from the annihilation of the fluorescer radical cation with the carbon dioxide radical anion formed when the 1,2-dioxetanedione decomposes. This process is called chemically induced electron exchange luminescence (CIEEL).

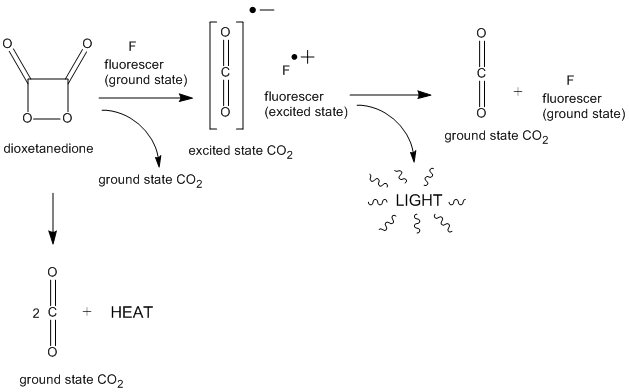

Chemiluminescent reactions are widely used in analytical chemistry.
