= Diphenyl oxalate =

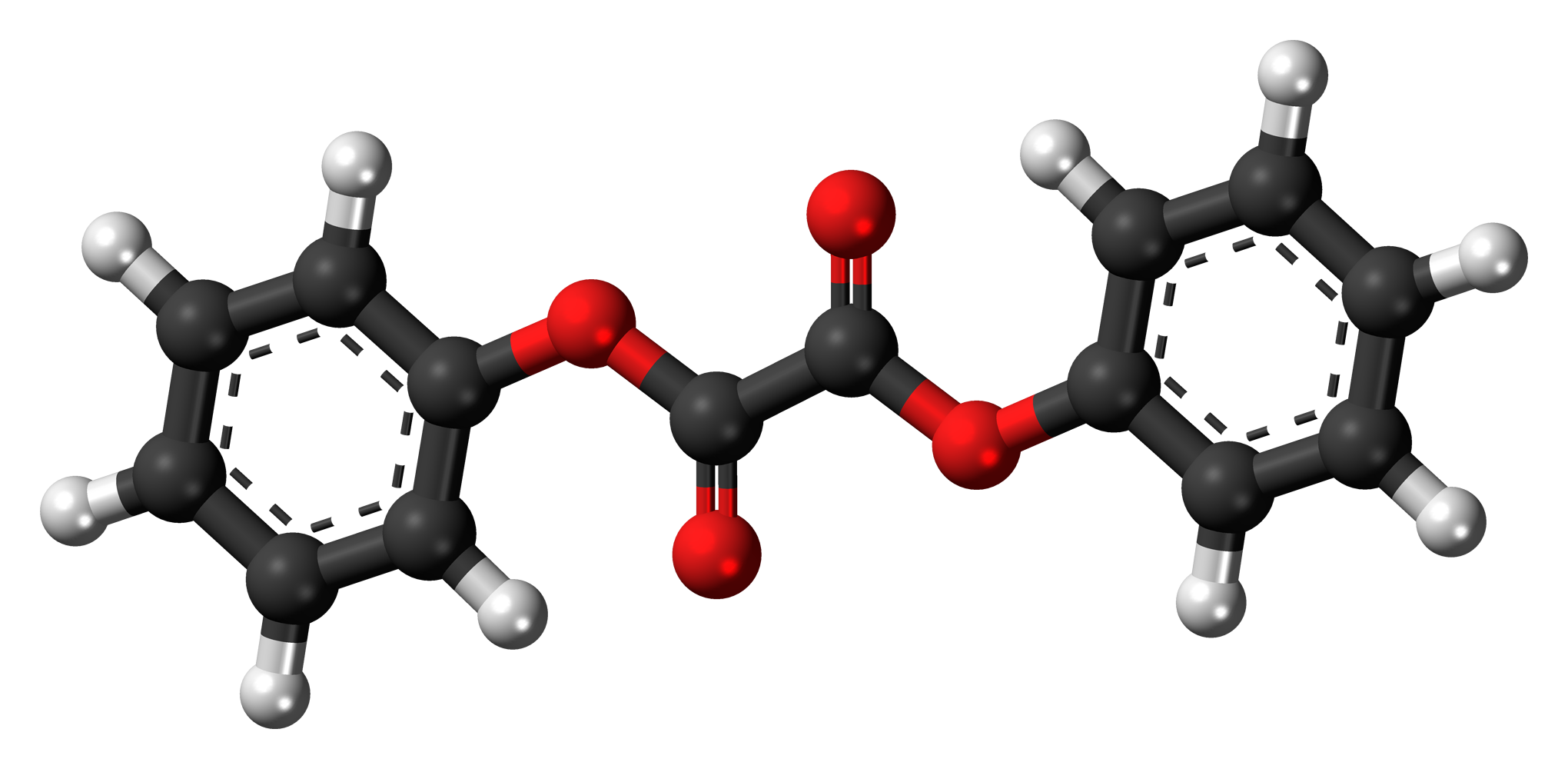

Names
- Preferred IUPAC name Diphenyl oxalate
- Other names diphenylethandioate, oxalic acid diphenyl ester, cyalume, DPO

Identifiers
CAS Number	3155-16-6
3D model (JSmol)	Interactive image
ChemSpider	17449
ECHA InfoCard	100.203.380
PubChem CID	18475
UNII	7BB9D5HPC2
CompTox Dashboard (EPA)	DTXSID50185452
- InChI: InChI=1S/C14H10O4/c15-13(17-11-7-3-1-4-8-11)14(16)18-12-9-5-2-6-10-12/h1-10H Key: ULOZDEVJRTYKFE-UHFFFAOYSA-N; InChI=1/C14H10O4/c15-13(17-11-7-3-1-4-8-11)14(16)18-12-9-5-2-6-10-12/h1-10H Key: ULOZDEVJRTYKFE-UHFFFAOYAB
- SMILES: O=C(Oc1ccccc1)C(=O)Oc2ccccc2

Properties
Chemical formula	C_{14}H_{10}O_{4}
Molar mass	242.227 g/mol
Appearance	solid
Melting point	136 °C (277 °F; 409 K)

Thermochemistry
Std enthalpy of formation (Δ_{f}H^{⦵}_{298})	129·0 ± 0·8

Related compounds
Related compounds	Dimethyl oxalate
- Except where otherwise noted, data are given for materials in their standard state (at 25 °C [77 °F], 100 kPa). verify (what is ?) Infobox references

Diphenyl oxalate (trademark name Cyalume) is a solid whose oxidation products are responsible for the chemiluminescence in a glowstick. This chemical is the double ester of phenol with oxalic acid. Upon reaction with hydrogen peroxide, 1,2-dioxetanedione is formed, along with release of the two phenols. The dioxetanedione then reacts with a dye molecule, decomposing to form carbon dioxide and leaving the dye in an excited state. As the dye relaxes back to its unexcited state, it releases a photon of visible light.

The reaction rate is pH dependent, and slightly alkaline conditions, achieved by adding a weak base, such as sodium salicylate, give a faster reaction and therefore produce brighter light. The 2,4,6-trichlorophenol ester is a solid and thus easier to handle. Furthermore, since trichlorophenolate is the better leaving group, the reaction will proceed faster, again producing brighter light, as compared to the phenol ester.

The following colors can be produced by using different dyes:

Color	Compound
Blue	9,10-Diphenylanthracene
Green	9,10-Bis(phenylethynyl)anthracene
Yellow-green	Tetracene
Yellow	1-Chloro-9,10-bis(phenylethynyl)anthracene
Orange	5,12-Bis(phenylethynyl)naphthacene, Rubrene, Rhodamine 6G
Red	Rhodamine B
