= Bis(2,4,5-trichloro-6-(pentyloxycarbonyl)phenyl)oxalate =

Bis[2,4,5-trichloro-6-(pentyloxycarbonyl)phenyl]oxalate

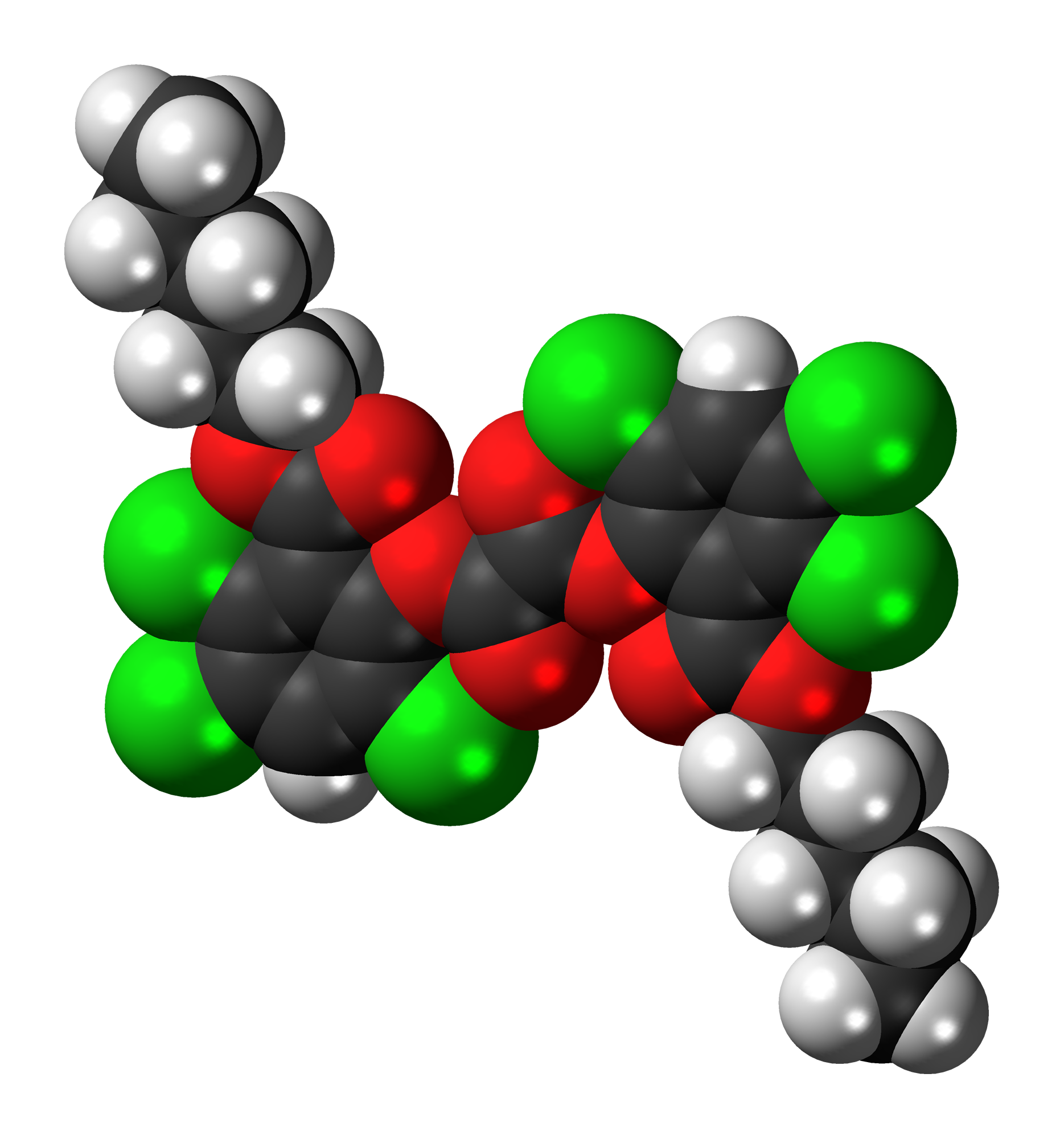

Names
- Preferred IUPAC name Bis{3,4,6-trichloro-2-[(pentyloxy)carbonyl]phenyl} oxalate
- Other names CPPO

Identifiers
CAS Number	30431-54-0
3D model (JSmol)	Interactive image
ChemSpider	84082
ECHA InfoCard	100.045.618
PubChem CID	93137
UNII	44594F9XR2
CompTox Dashboard (EPA)	DTXSID0067559
- InChI: InChI=1S/C26H24Cl6O8/c1-3-5-7-9-37-23(33)17-19(31)13(27)11-15(29)21(17)39-25(35)26(36)40-22-16(30)12-14(28)20(32)18(22)24(34)38-10-8-6-4-2/h11-12H,3-10H2,1-2H3 Key: TZZLVFUOAYMTHA-UHFFFAOYSA-N; InChI=1/C26H24Cl6O8/c1-3-5-7-9-37-23(33)17-19(31)13(27)11-15(29)21(17)39-25(35)26(36)40-22-16(30)12-14(28)20(32)18(22)24(34)38-10-8-6-4-2/h11-12H,3-10H2,1-2H3 Key: TZZLVFUOAYMTHA-UHFFFAOYAP
- SMILES: Clc2c(C(=O)OCCCCC)c(OC(=O)C(=O)Oc1c(C(=O)OCCCCC)c(Cl)c(Cl)cc1Cl)c(Cl)cc2Cl

Properties
Chemical formula	C_{26}H_{24}Cl_{6}O_{8}
Molar mass	677.17 g·mol^{−1}
Melting point	80 to 82 °C (176 to 180 °F; 353 to 355 K)

Hazards
- GHS labelling
Pictograms	(GHS07: Exclamation mark)
Signal word	Warning
Hazard statements	H302, H302+H312+H332, H312, H317, H332
Precautionary statements	P261, P264, P270, P271, P272, P280, P301+P317, P302+P352, P304+P340, P317, P321, P330, P333+P317, P362+P364, P501
- Except where otherwise noted, data are given for materials in their standard state (at 25 °C [77 °F], 100 kPa). verify (what is ?) Infobox references

Bis[2,4,5-trichloro-6-(pentyloxycarbonyl)phenyl]oxalate (also known as bis(2,4,5-trichloro-6-carbopentoxyphenyl) oxalate or CPPO) is an organic compound with the formula (C_{5}H_{11}O_{2}CC_{6}HCl_{3}O)_{2}C_{2}O_{2}. A white solid, it is classified as a diester of oxalic acid. It is an active ingredient for the chemiluminescence in glow sticks. It can be synthesized by reacting 2-carbopentoxy-3,5,6-trichlorophenol with oxalyl chloride.

When mixed with hydrogen peroxide in an organic solvent (diethyl phthalate, ethyl acetate, etc...) in the presence of a fluorescent dye CPPO causes the emission of light, following its degradation to 1,2-dioxetanedione (note that many side-groups of the aromatic rings are not shown.):

The reaction rate is pH dependent, and slightly alkaline conditions achieved by adding a weak base, e.g. sodium salicylate, will produce brighter light. Developed by American Cyanamid in the 1960s, the formulation containing CPPO, a fluorescer, and a glass capsule containing hydrogen peroxide and a base catalyst, all in dialkyl phthalate solvents, was marketed as Cyalume. Current Cyalume products no longer use any phthalate solvents.

The following colors can be produced by using different dyes:

Color	Compound
Blue	9,10-Diphenylanthracene
Green	9,10-Bis(phenylethynyl)anthracene
Yellow-green	Tetracene
Yellow	1-Chloro-9,10-bis(phenylethynyl)anthracene
Orange	5,12-Bis(phenylethynyl)naphthacene, Rubrene, Rhodamine 6G
Red	2,4-Di-tert-butylphenyl 1,4,5,8-tetracarboxynaphthalene diamide, Rhodamine 101, Rhodamine B
