= C2O4 =

The molecular formula C_{2}O_{4} (molar mass: 88.02 g/mol) may refer to:

- Oxalate (ethanedioate)
- Dioxetanediones:
  - 1,2-Dioxetanedione (1,2-dioxetane-3,4-dione)
  - 1,3-Dioxetanedione (1,3-dioxetane-2,4-dione)
