= Bis(2,4-dinitrophenyl) oxalate =

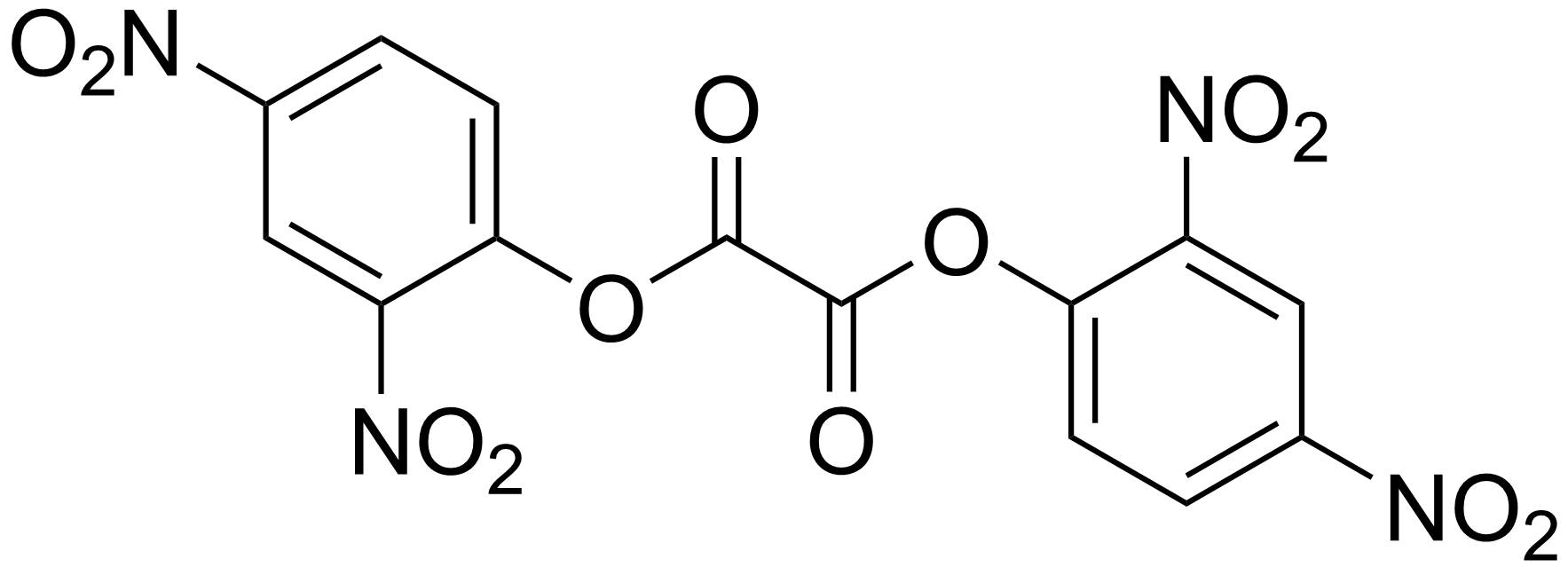

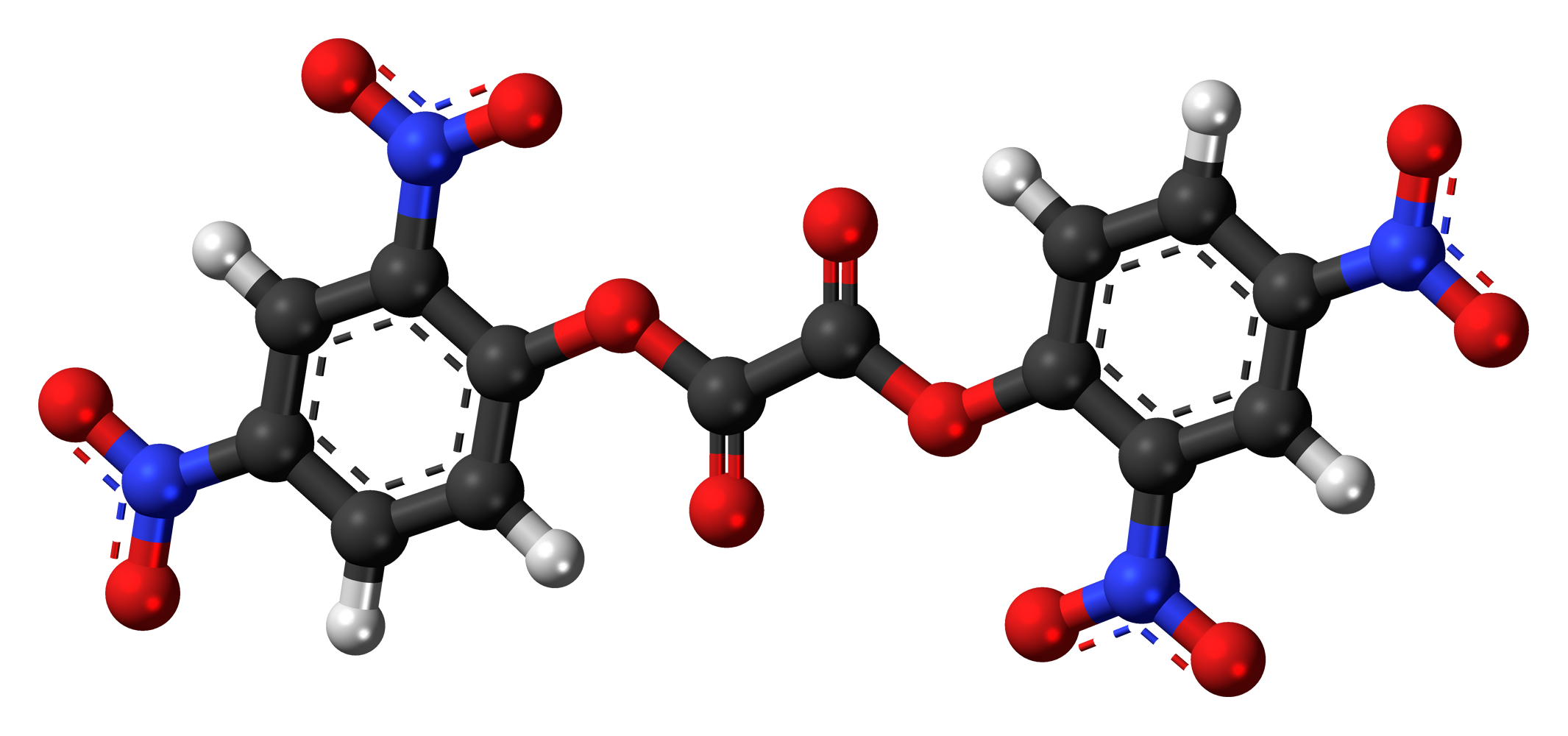

Names
- Preferred IUPAC name Bis(2,4-dinitrophenyl) oxalate
- Other names Oxalic acid bis(2,4-dinitrophenyl) ester

Identifiers
CAS Number	16536-30-4
3D model (JSmol)	Interactive image
Abbreviations	DNPO
ChemSpider	2338445
ECHA InfoCard	100.156.735
PubChem CID	3080704
UNII	A4Q7NQ4ENT
CompTox Dashboard (EPA)	DTXSID90167934
- InChI: InChI=1S/C14H6N4O12/c19-13(29-11-3-1-7(15(21)22)5-9(11)17(25)26)14(20)30-12-4-2-8(16(23)24)6-10(12)18(27)28/h1-6H Key: CBZOGAWUNMFXFQ-UHFFFAOYSA-N; InChI=1/C14H6N4O12/c19-13(29-11-3-1-7(15(21)22)5-9(11)17(25)26)14(20)30-12-4-2-8(16(23)24)6-10(12)18(27)28/h1-6H Key: CBZOGAWUNMFXFQ-UHFFFAOYAZ
- SMILES: O=C(Oc1ccc(cc1[N+]([O-])=O)[N+]([O-])=O)C(=O)Oc2ccc([N+]([O-])=O)cc2[N+]([O-])=O

Properties
Chemical formula	C_{14}H_{6}N_{4}O_{12}
Molar mass	422.218 g·mol^{−1}
Appearance	White crystalline powder
Density	1.759 g/cm^{3}

Hazards
- GHS labelling
Pictograms	(GHS07: Exclamation mark)
Signal word	Warning
Hazard statements	H315, H319, H335
Precautionary statements	P261, P264, P264+P265, P271, P280, P302+P352, P304+P340, P305+P351+P338, P319, P321, P332+P317, P337+P317, P362+P364, P403+P233, P405, P501
- Except where otherwise noted, data are given for materials in their standard state (at 25 °C [77 °F], 100 kPa). verify (what is ?) Infobox references

Bis(2,4-dinitrophenyl) oxalate (DNPO) is a source of 1,2-dioxetanedione, a chemical used in glow sticks. Other chemicals related to DNPO used in glow sticks include bis(2,4,6-trichlorophenyl)oxalate (TCPO) and bis(2,4,5-trichlorophenyl-6-carbopentoxyphenyl)oxalate (CPPO).
