= C30H17Cl =

The molecular formula C_{30}H_{17}Cl (molar mass: 412.91 g/mol) may refer to:

- 1-Chloro-9,10-bis(phenylethynyl)anthracene, a fluorescent dye
- 2-Chloro-9,10-bis(phenylethynyl)anthracene, a fluorescent dye
