= TCPO =

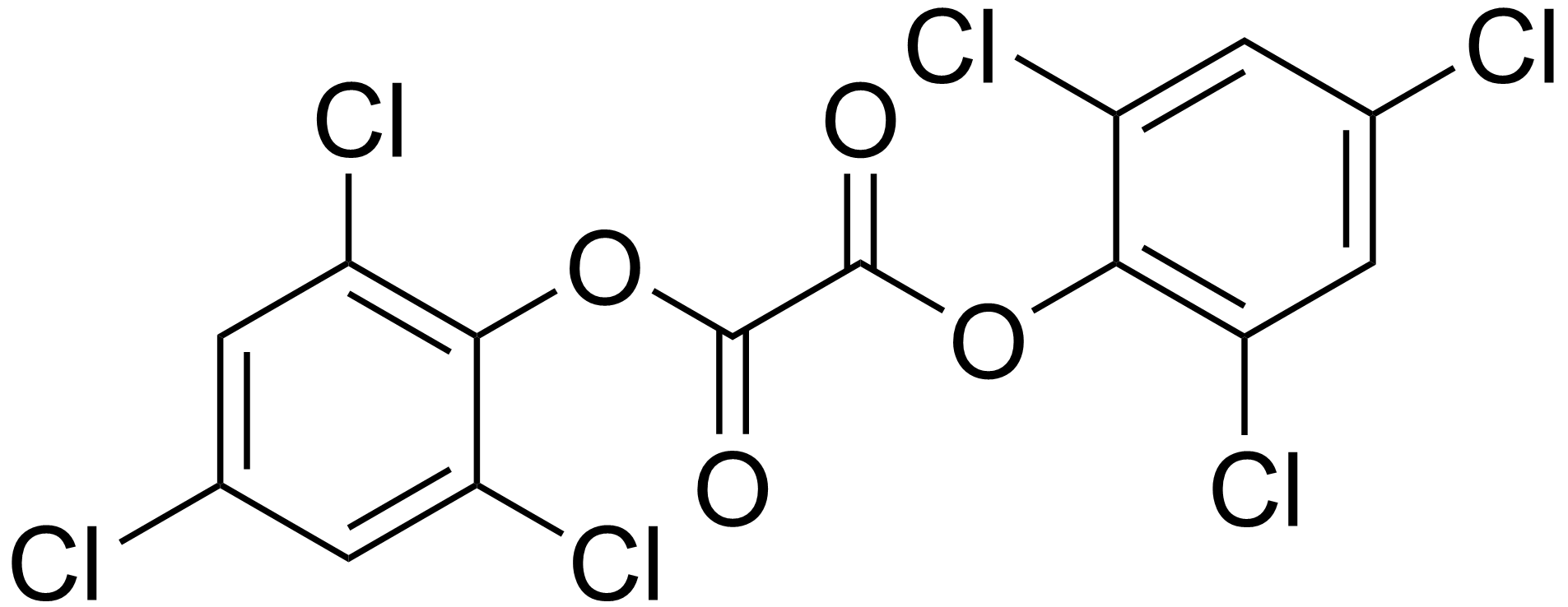

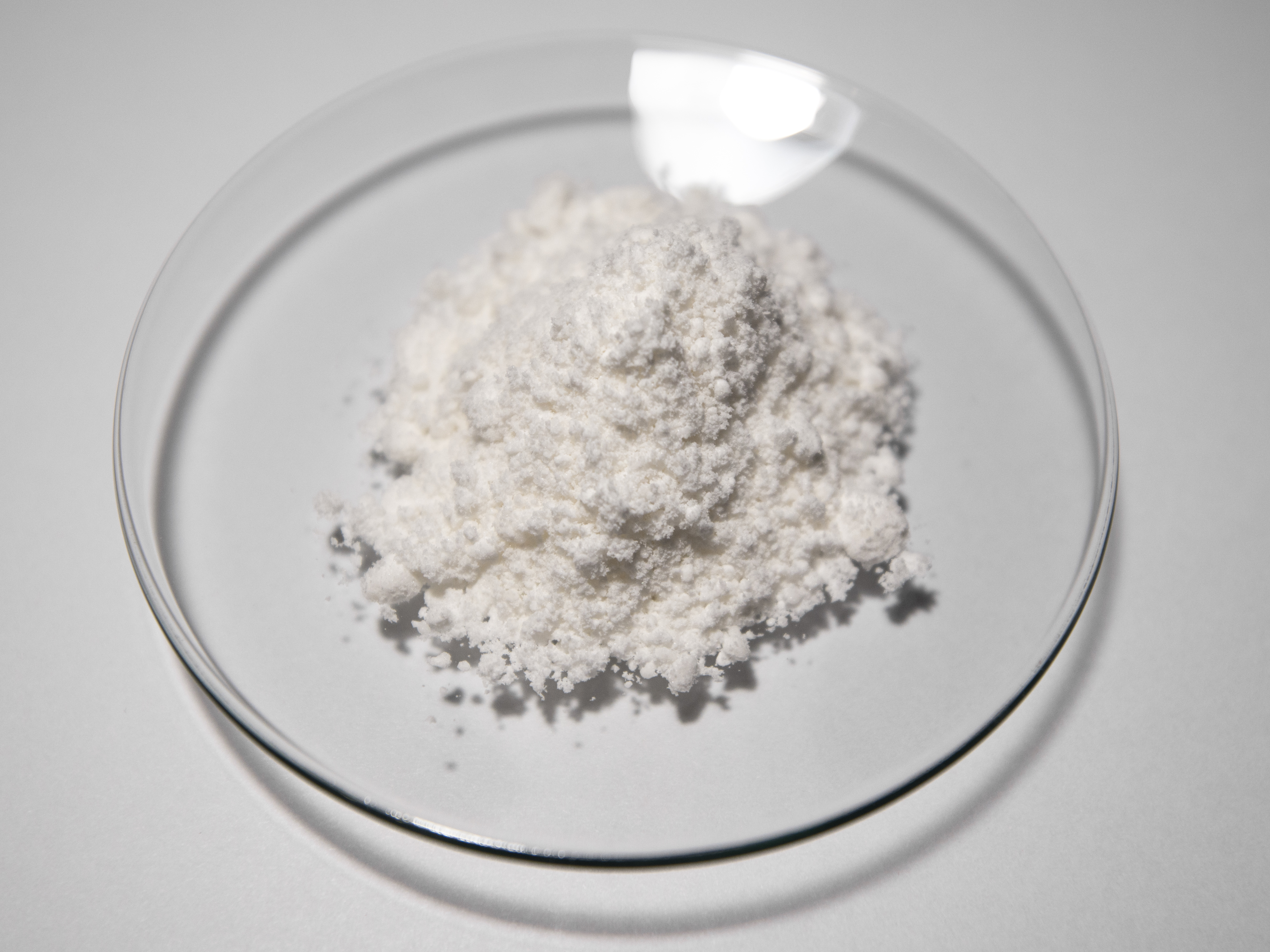
- Sample of pure compound

Names
- Preferred IUPAC name Bis(2,4,6-trichlorophenyl) oxalate
- Other names Bis(2,4,6-trichlorophenyl) ethanedioate; Oxalic acid, bis(2,4,6-trichlorophenyl) ester

Identifiers
CAS Number	1165-91-9
3D model (JSmol)	Interactive image
ChemSpider	141097
ECHA InfoCard	100.157.526
PubChem CID	160567
CompTox Dashboard (EPA)	DTXSID80151403
- InChI: InChI=/C14H4Cl6O4/c15-5-1-7(17)11(8(18)2-5)23-13(21)14(22)24-12-9(19)3-6(16)4-10(12)20/h1-4H
- SMILES: O=C(C(OC1=C(Cl)C=C(Cl)C=C1Cl)=O)OC2=C(Cl)C=C(Cl)C=C2Cl

Properties
Chemical formula	C_{14}H_{4}Cl_{6}O_{4}
Molar mass	448.88 g·mol^{−1}
Appearance	White crystalline powder
Density	1.698 g/cm^{3}
Melting point	188 to 192 °C (370 to 378 °F; 461 to 465 K)
Boiling point	500.9 °C (933.6 °F; 774.0 K)
Solubility in water	0.01962 mg/L

Hazards
- GHS labelling
Pictograms	(GHS07: Exclamation mark)
Signal word	Warning
Hazard statements	H315, H319, H335
Precautionary statements	P261, P264, P265, P271, P280, P302+P352, P304+P340, P305+P351+P338, P319, P321, P332+P317, P337+P317, P362+P364, P403+P233, P405, P501
Flash point	190.6 °C (375.1 °F; 463.8 K)
- Except where otherwise noted, data are given for materials in their standard state (at 25 °C [77 °F], 100 kPa). Infobox references

TCPO, or bis(2,4,6-trichlorophenyl) oxalate, is a chemical used in some types of glow sticks and is a key chemical in many chemiluminescent reactions.

== Uses ==
When combined with a fluorescent dye like 9,10-bis(phenylethynyl)anthracene, a solvent (such as diethyl phthalate), and a weak base (usually sodium acetate or sodium salicylate), and hydrogen peroxide, the mixture will start a chemiluminescent reaction to glow a fluorescent green color.

Red, yellow and blue colors can be made by replacing the 9,10-bis(phenylethynyl)anthracene with rhodamine B, rubrene and 9,10-diphenylanthracene respectively.

The above fluorescent dyes absorb much of the energy produced during the decomposition of the oxalate ester, and convert that energy into light energy which is observed as the characteristic glow in products such as glowsticks.

== Preparation ==
TCPO can be prepared from a solution of 2,4,6-trichlorophenol in dry toluene by reaction with oxalyl chloride in the presence of a base such as triethylamine. This method produces crude TCPO with a by-product of triethylamine hydrochloride. The product is washed with water to remove the byproduct and recrystallized from toluene.

== See also ==
- Bis(2,4,5-trichlorophenyl-6-carbopentoxyphenyl)oxalate (CPPO)
- MCPO
- Trichlorophenol
- 2,4,5-Trichlorophenol
