= Dioxetanedione =

Dioxetanedione may refer to:

- 1,2-Dioxetanedione
- 1,3-Dioxetanedione
