= 2-Chloro-9,10-diphenylanthracene =

2-chloro-9,10-diphenyl-anthracene
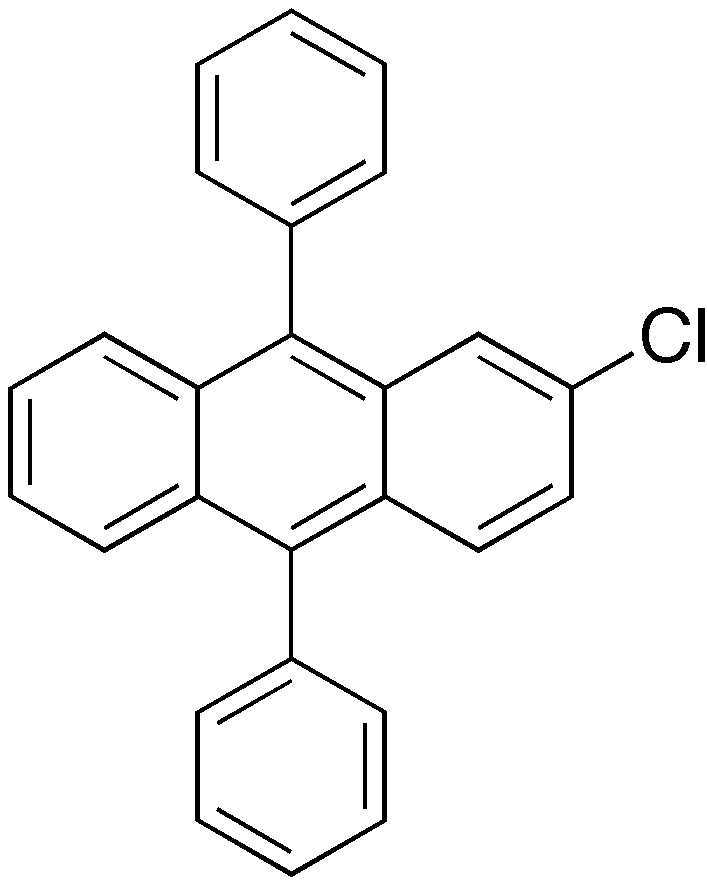

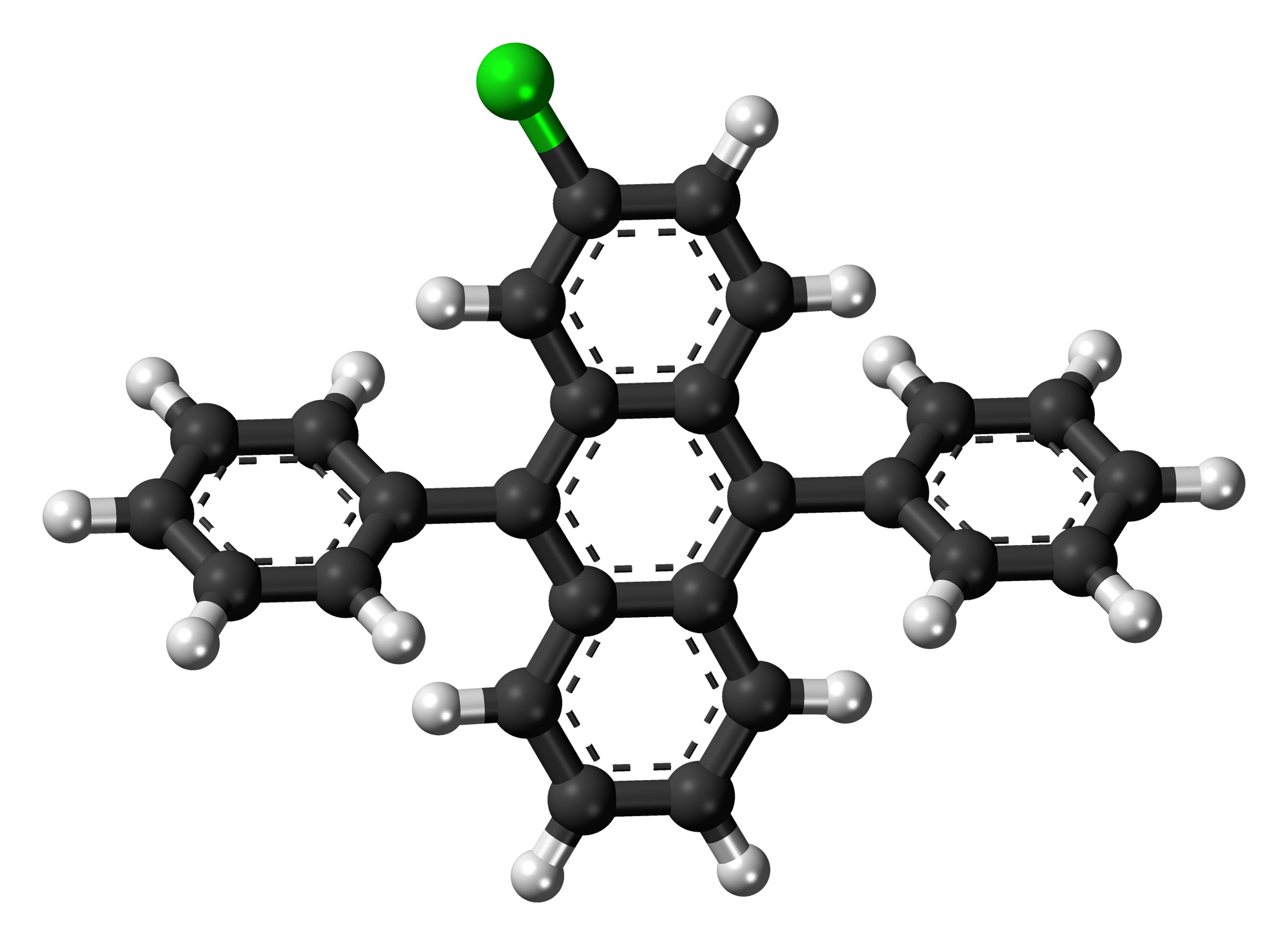

Names
- Preferred IUPAC name 2-Chloro-9,10-diphenylanthracene

Identifiers
CAS Number	43217-28-3
3D model (JSmol)	Interactive image
ChemSpider	549193
PubChem CID	632525
UNII	CA5BB2U3W8
CompTox Dashboard (EPA)	DTXSID20348214
- InChI: InChI=1S/C26H17Cl/c27-20-15-16-23-24(17-20)26(19-11-5-2-6-12-19)22-14-8-7-13-21(22)25(23)18-9-3-1-4-10-18/h1-17H Key: PLMFIWDPKYXMGE-UHFFFAOYSA-N; InChI=1/C26H17Cl/c27-20-15-16-23-24(17-20)26(19-11-5-2-6-12-19)22-14-8-7-13-21(22)25(23)18-9-3-1-4-10-18/h1-17H Key: PLMFIWDPKYXMGE-UHFFFAOYAZ
- SMILES: Clc4ccc3c(c1ccccc1c(c2ccccc2)c3c4)c5ccccc5

Properties
Chemical formula	C_{26}H_{17}Cl
Molar mass	364.87 g·mol^{−1}
- Except where otherwise noted, data are given for materials in their standard state (at 25 °C [77 °F], 100 kPa). verify (what is ?) Infobox references

2-Chloro-9,10-diphenylanthracene is a fluorescent dye used in glow sticks for a blue-green glow. It is a chlorinated derivative of 9,10-diphenylanthracene.

== See also ==
- 2-Chloro-9,10-bis(phenylethynyl)anthracene
