= C18H14O8 =

The molecular formula C_{18}H_{14}O_{8} (molar mass: 358.302 g/mol) may refer to:

- Psoromic acid
- MCPO
