= DNPO =

DNPO may refer to:

- Bis(2,4-dinitrophenyl) oxalate, a chemical used in glowsticks
- Dinitrogen pentoxide, an inorganic chemical compound
- DNPO, the ICAO airport code for Port Harcourt International Airport
- "Do Not Power On", an acronym used in data center administration to warn others not to power on server machines. See Lockout-Tagout.
