= John W. Birks =

American professor at the University of Colorado Boulder

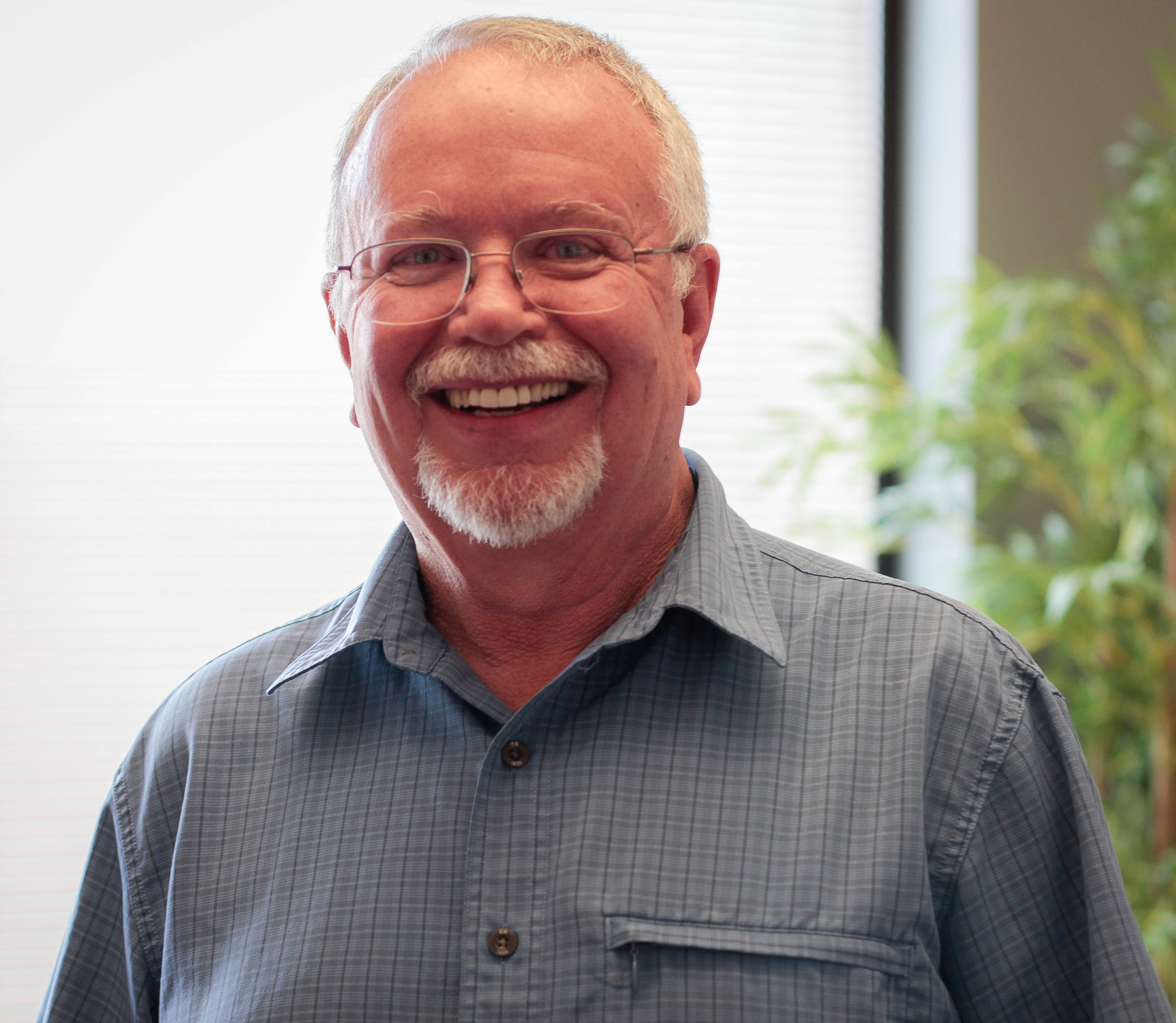
- Birks in 2014
- Born: John W. Birks; 10 December 1946; Vinita, Oklahoma, United States
- Education: University of California, Berkeley; University of Arkansas
- Known for: Research in atmospheric chemistry, co-developer of the nuclear winter theory and development of air pollution monitors
- Awards: Alfred P. Sloan Fellowship (1979-81); Leo Szilard Award for Physics in the Public Interest (1985); John Simon Guggenheim Fellowship (1986); Witherspoon Peace and Justice Award (1986); Thomas Jefferson Award, University of Colorado (1989); Hazel Barnes Prize, University of Colorado (2000); ACS Award for Creative Advances in Environmental Science and Technology (2003); Haagen-Smit Clean Air Award (2019); Future of Life Award, Future of Life Institute (2022)
- Scientific career
- Fields: Atmospheric chemistry; Physical Chemistry; Analytical Chemistry
- Workplaces: University of Illinois Urbana-Champaign; University of Colorado Boulder; 2B Technologies
- Thesis: [escholarship.org/uc/item/9nk8c936 Theory of the Dissociation of Diatomic Molecules and a Study of the Emission Spectra of IF] (1974)
- Doctoral advisor: Harold S. Johnston
- Website: twobtech.com/john-birks.html

John W. Birks (born 10 December 1946, in Vinita, Oklahoma, USA) is an American atmospheric chemist and entrepreneur who is best known for co-discovery with Paul Crutzen of the potential atmospheric effects of nuclear war known as nuclear winter. His most recent awards include the 2019 Haagen-Smit Clean Air Award for his contributions to atmospheric chemistry and the 2022 Future of Life Award for discovery of the nuclear winter effect.

As an entrepreneur, Birks co-founded the two technology companies, 2B Technologies and InDevR. At 2B Technologies he served as president during 2005-2020 and currently serves as Chief Scientist.

== Early life and education ==
Birks received his BS (1968) degree in chemistry with high honors from the University of Arkansas. He carried out his graduate work at the University of California, Berkeley where he completed his MS (1970) and PhD (1974) in physical chemistry under the direction of Professor Harold S. Johnston, being co-directed by Henry F. Schaeffer III and William H. Miller during his final year of graduate studies. During a 1970-72 break between his MS and PhD studies at Berkeley, he performed alternative service as a conscientious objector to the Vietnam War as a research assistant at the Kansas University Medical Center.

== Research and career ==
Birks began his academic career in 1974 when he joined the University of Illinois at Urbana-Champaign as an assistant professor in the Department of Chemistry.

In 1977, he accepted the positions of associate professor of Chemistry and Fellow of the Cooperative Institute for Research in Environmental Sciences (CIRES) at the University of Colorado Boulder where he could collaborate more closely with scientists at the National Oceanic and Atmospheric Administration and the National Center for Atmospheric Research. He was promoted to full Professor in the Department of Chemistry and Biochemistry at CU Boulder in 1984 and served as chair of the department during 1995–1998.

Birks received the Alfred P. Sloan Fellowship in 1979 and John Simon Guggenheim Fellowship in 1986.

Birks co-founded 2B Technologies, a company specializing in the development of instruments for environmental and atmospheric measurements, with Dr. Mark Bollinger in 1998. After twenty-five years of service, he retired from the University of Colorado Boulder in 2002 and joined 2B Technologies as vice president. In 2005, he assumed leadership of 2B Technologies as president.

Since 2002, he has been professor emeritus of the Department of Chemistry and Fellow Emeritus of the Cooperative Institute for Research in Environmental Sciences.

In 2003, Birks received the ACS Award for Creative Advances in Environmental Science and Technology from the American Chemical Society "for his measurements of the rate coefficients of chemical reactions key to understanding stratospheric ozone depletion, co-development of the nuclear winter theory, and invention of new analytical instruments for environmental analysis."

In 2009, he founded the Global Ozone (GO3) Project, a non-profit middle and high school outreach program for ground-level ozone measurements. The AQTreks educational outreach program, an outgrowth of the GO3 Project that allows students to perform mobile monitoring of air pollutants along treks of their own design, was founded by Birks and his colleagues in 2017.

In 2019, Birks received the Haagen-Smit Clean Air Award, also known as the "Nobel prize of air pollution and climate science", from the California Air Resources Board (CARB). The award was given for having "advanced our understanding of Earth's atmosphere through more than 40 years of research, teaching and technological innovation."

In 2022, John Birks received the Future of Life Award from the Future of Life Institute "for reducing the risk of nuclear war by developing and popularizing the science of nuclear winter."

=== Kinetics studies of atmospheric reactions ===
Birks' early research focused on discovering new reactions that are important in controlling ozone levels in the stratosphere. He and his research team at the University of Illinois and later at the University of Colorado Boulder published some of the first measurements of the temperature-dependent rate coefficients and product distributions for important stratospheric reactions. Some notable works were introductions of the species chlorine nitrate (ClONO_{2}) and hypochlorous acid (HOCl) to stratospheric chemistry via measurements of the rates of reactions forming those species.

In 1977, the rate coefficient for the reaction ClO + NO_{2} + M → ClONO_{2} + M was first reported by the Birks research group. Although the formation of chlorine nitrate reduces the effect of chlorine on stratospheric ozone at mid latitudes, it was later discovered by Susan Solomon that chlorine nitrate plays a key role in the formation of the Antarctic "ozone hole", reacting in the Austral spring with HCl on the surfaces of polar stratospheric clouds to produce catalytic forms of chlorine. The Birks group also was among the first to report temperature-dependent rate coefficients and branching ratios for catalytic reactions involving bromine (BrO+ClO and BrO+BrO reactions), which were found to contribute ~20% of ozone depletion in the Antarctic ozone hole.

=== Discovery of nuclear winter effect ===
During his 1981/82 academic sabbatical at the Max Planck Institute in Mainz, Germany, Birks worked with Paul J. Crutzen (Nobel Laurette, 1995) and wrote the first publication introducing the subject of what became known as nuclear winter: The atmosphere after a nuclear war: Twilight at noon (1982). Their calculations showed that fires in cities, forests and oil production and storage facilities resulting from a major nuclear war would produce enough smoke to block as much as 99 percent of sunlight from reaching the Earth's surface throughout the northern hemisphere. This work, published in 1982 in a special issue of the Swedish journal Ambio as part of a larger study of the environmental effects of nuclear warfare commissioned by the Swedish Academy of Sciences, was followed by a paper by Richard Turco, Brian Toon, Thomas Ackerman, James Pollack and Carl Sagan (TTAPS) in the journal Science in 1983. These two papers resulted in multi-year studies involving numerous government agencies and laboratories and evaluation reports by the National Academy of Sciences (1985), the World Health Organization (WHO), and the Scientific Committee on Problems of the Environment of the International Council of Scientific Unions (ICSU/SCOPE) on the environmental effects of nuclear war.

=== Highly portable instruments for air quality measurements ===
In 1998 Birks co-founded 2B Technologies with Dr. Mark Bollinger to develop and commercialize a new generation of miniature air monitoring instruments. At 2B Technologies, Birks led the development of more than 20 different models of highly portable and highly accurate instruments for trace-level monitoring of the air pollutants O_{3}, NO, NO_{2}, NO_{x}, mercury and black carbon, and portable calibrators for O_{3}, NO and NO_{2}. Seven of the instruments, including the pocket-sized Personal Ozone Monitor (POM), have been designated as EPA Federal Equivalent Methods (FEM). In 2020, 2B Technologies received a Tibbetts Award from the Small Business Administration for development of many of these air monitoring technologies through the Small Business Innovation Research (SBIR) federal research grants program. Birks served as Principal Investigator on the 15 SBIR grants awarded to 2B Technologies by the Department of Energy (DOE), National Science Foundation (NSF), Centers for Disease Control and Prevention (CDC) and National Institute of Environmental Health Sciences of the National Institutes of Health (NIEHS/NIH).

=== K-12 Educational Outreach ===
In 2009 Dr. Birks founded the Global Ozone Project or "GO3" Project, a middle and high school outreach program where students at more than 100 schools around the world measure ozone using a FEM ozone monitor (2B Tech Model 106-L) along with meteorological parameters using a Davis weather station. In that project, data were continuously uploaded to a database for display on Google Earth and online graphing along with participation from schools around the world, including 30 international schools. More than 12 million ozone measurements and associated meteorological parameters were uploaded by these student-run monitoring stations. This fixed-base monitoring program was replaced by a mobile monitoring project, AQTreks, in which students explore the concentrations of air pollutants (PM_{1}, PM_{2.5}, PM_{10}, CO, CO_{2}) in their communities along "treks" of their own design. Approximately 20,000 students at more than 250 U.S. schools have participated in the GO3 Project and AQTreks over the past 10 years.

== Awards and honors ==
Some of Birks's honors include the below:

- 1979-81: Alfred P. Sloan Fellowship
- 1985: Leo Szilard Award for Physics in the Public Interest, American Physical Society
- 1986: John Simon Guggenheim Fellowship
- 1986: Witherspoon Peace and Justice Award, Witherspoon Society
- 1989: Thomas Jefferson Award, University of Colorado
- 1990: Colorado Section Award, American Chemical Society
- 1990: Teaching Fellowship, University of Colorado Council on Teaching
- 2000: Hazel Barnes Prize, Highest University of Colorado Faculty Award
- 2003: ACS Award for Creative Advances in Environmental Science and Technology, American Chemical Society
- 2019: Haagen-Smit Clean Air Award, Science and Technology Category, California Air Resources Board
- 2022: Future of Life Award, Future of Life Institute

== Bibliography ==
=== Books edited ===
- Birks, John W. (1989). Chemiluminescence and Photochemical Reaction Detection in Chromatography
- Ehrlich, Anne H.; Birks, John W. (1990). Hidden Dangers: The Environmental Consequences of Preparing for War
- Birks, John W.; Calvert, Jack G.; Sievers, Robert E. (1992). The Chemistry of the Atmosphere: Its Impact on Global Change

=== Selected publications ===
- Activation energies for the dissociation of diatomic molecules are less than the bond dissociation energies (1972)
- Effect of nuclear explosions on stratospheric nitric oxide and ozone (1973)
- Chemiluminescence of IF in the gas phase reaction of I_{2} with F_{2}
- Studies of reactions of importance in the stratosphere. I. Reaction of nitric oxide with ozone (1976)
- Studies of reactions of importance in the stratosphere. II. Reactions involving chlorine nitrate and chlorine dioxide (1980)
- Studies of reactions of importance in the stratosphere. III. Rate constant and products of the reaction between ClO and HO_{2} radicals at 298 K (1980)
- Studies of reactions of importance in the stratosphere. IV. Rate constant for the reaction Cl + HOCl → HCl + ClO over the temperature range 243-365 K (1981)
- The atmosphere after a nuclear war: Twilight at noon (1982)
- High precision measurements of activation energies over small temperature intervals: Curvature in the Arrhenius plot for the reaction NO + O_{3} → NO_{2} + O_{2} (1982)
- Studies of reactions of importance in the stratosphere. V. Rate constants for the reactions O + NO_{2} → NO + O_{2} and O + ClO → Cl + O_{2} at 298 K (1984)
- Studies of reactions of importance in the stratosphere. VI. Temperature dependence of the reactions O + NO_{2} → NO + O_{2} and O + ClO → Cl + O_{2} (1986)
- Peroxyoxalate chemiluminescence detection of polycyclic aromatic hydrocarbons in liquid chromatography (1983)
- Peroxyoxalate chemiluminescence detection of polycyclic aromatic amines in liquid chromatography (1984)
- The effects on the atmosphere of a major nuclear exchange (1985)
- Luminol/H_{2}O_{2} chemiluminescence detector for the analysis of nitric oxide in exhaled breath (1999)
- Using polymeric materials to generate an amplified response to molecular recognition events (2008)
- Mechanism and elimination of a water vapor interference in the measurement of ozone by UV absorbance (2006)
- Miniature personal ozone monitor based on UV absorbance (2010)
- Use of a heated graphite scrubber as a means of reducing interferences in UV-absorbance measurements of atmospheric ozone (2017)
- Folded tubular photometer for atmospheric measurements of NO_{2} and NO (2018)
- Portable ozone calibration source independent of changes in temperature, pressure and humidity for research and regulatory applications (2018)
- Global Ozone (GO3) Project and AQTreks: Use of evolving technologies by students and citizen scientists to monitor air pollutants (2019)
- Portable calibrator for NO based on photolysis of N_{2}O and a combined NO/NO_{2}/O_{3} source for field calibrations of air pollution monitors (2020)
