= Glowmatography =

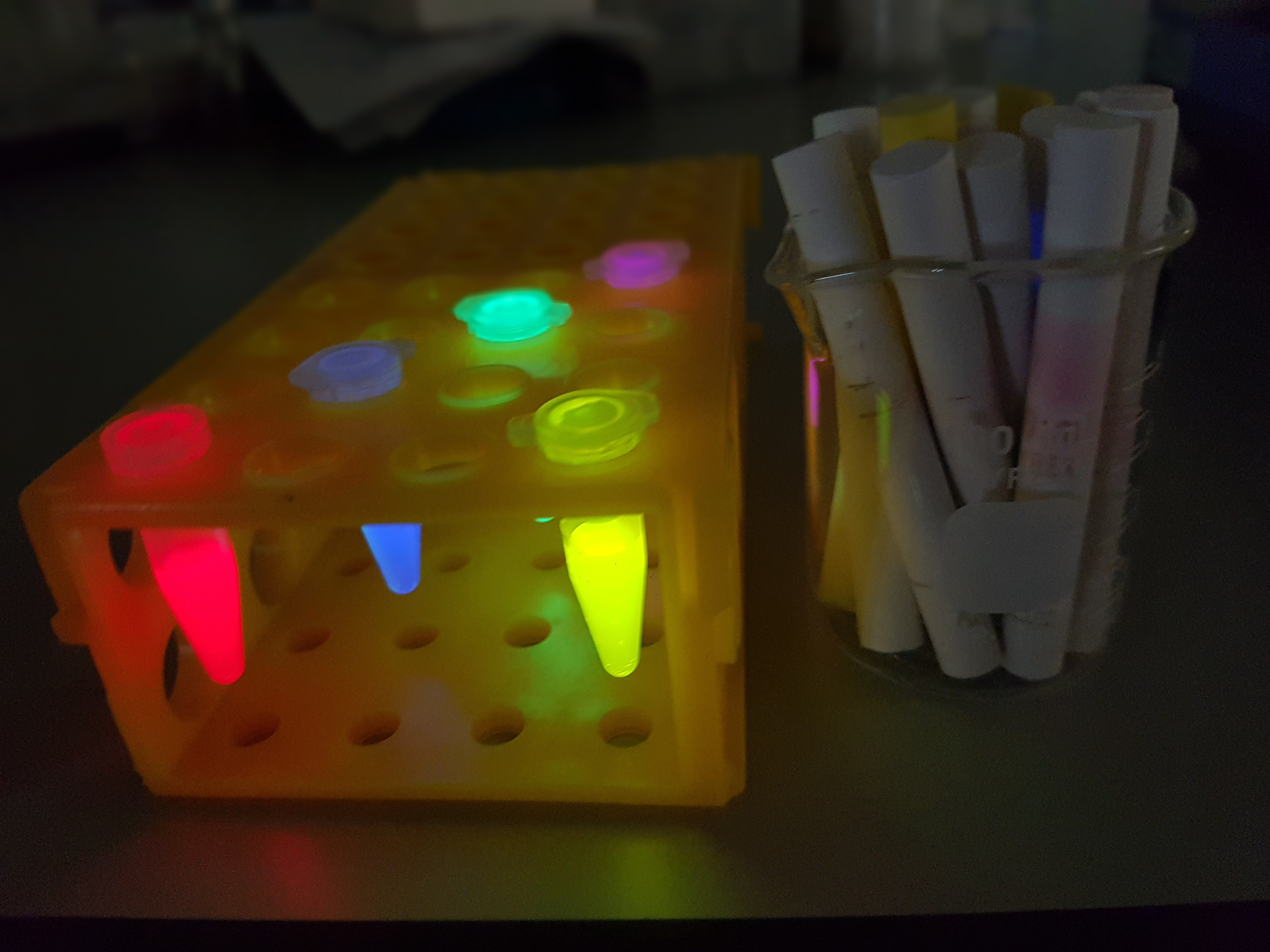
Glow stick solutions and chalk sticks - preparation for experiment

Glowmatography is a laboratory technique for the separation of dyes present in solutions contained in glow sticks. The chemical components of such solutions can be chromatographically separated into polar and nonpolar components. Developed as a laboratory class experiment, it can be used to demonstrate chemistry concepts of polarity, chemical kinetics, and chemiluminescence.

== Description ==
In the chromatography of a glow stick solution, a piece of chalk, a highly polar substance, is used as the stationary phase while comparatively less-polar solvents like acetone and 91% isopropyl alcohol can be used as the mobile phase. Chalk is made up of calcium carbonate (CaCO_{3}) or calcium sulfate (CaSO_{4}), and therefore contains ions. This allows it to attract other ions and polar molecules, but not nonpolar molecules. As a result, ionic and more-polar dyes would be attracted to the stationary phase and move relatively slowly or a fairly small distance, while less polar dyes would migrate further as the mobile phase wicks up the chalk. This then allows for the separation of dyes.

== Experiment ==
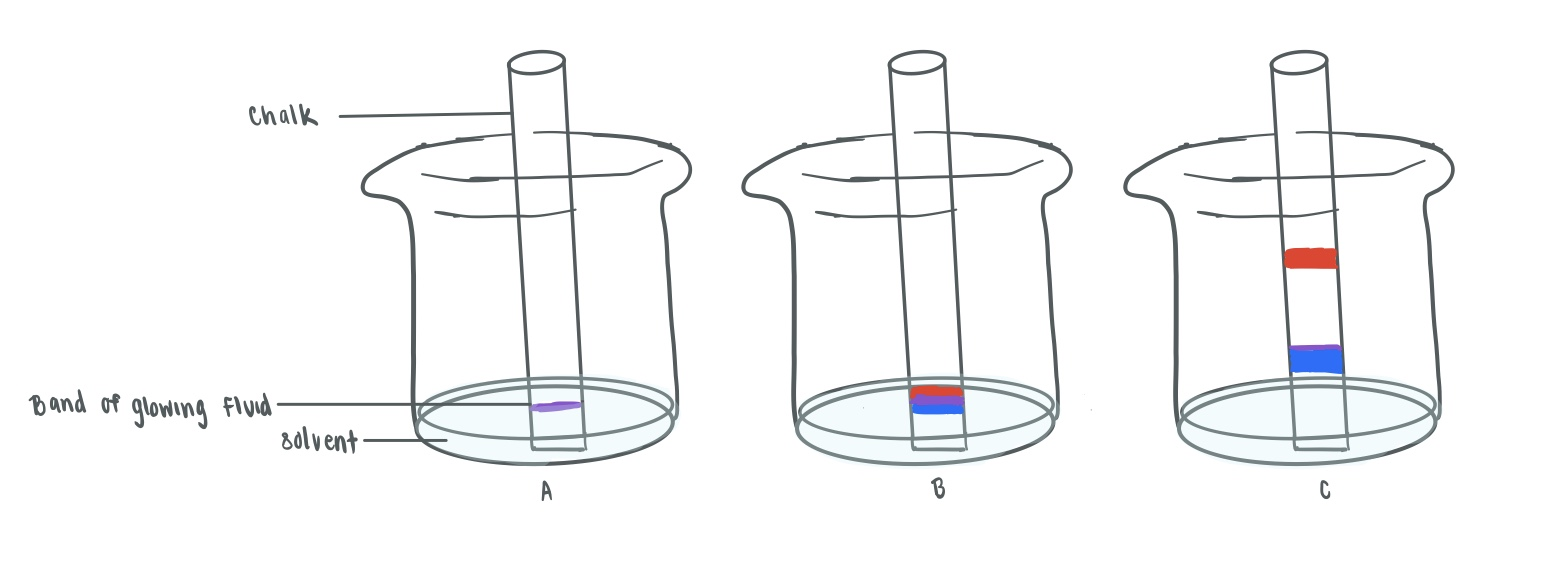
Diagram of glowmatography with purple dye. 1: Solvent travels up the chalk. 2: Separation starts as the red dye is attracted to the mobile phase and starts traveling up while the blue dye is attracted to the stationary phase and stays relatively still. 3: Complete separation occurs as time passes.

This experiment can be conducted with glow sticks, chalks, and solutions of acetone or isopropyl alcohol.

Drops of glowing fluid from a glow stick are added to a chalk so that a band is created halfway through it. The chalk is then placed vertically into a beaker filled with a small amount of acetone or alcohol - ensuring the surface of the solvent is below the dye band. The liquid is then allowed to travel up the chalk; polar dyes would tend to stick to the chalk and not travel significantly while non-polar dyes would travel up with the solvent. Once it travels almost to the top of the chalk, it is removed from the beaker. The chalk chromatogram, with separation of colours, can then be observed in a dark room.

Demonstration of glowmatography; experiment done over a span of about half an hour.

Additionally, this glomatographic experiment can be done using other materials. For instance, silica gel can be used as the stationary phase together with a solution of nonpolar hexanes acting as the mobile phase. The polar components would be attracted to the polar silanol (Si-OH) groups on the surface of the silica gel, and the nonpolar components would travel further with the hexanes. Further, dyes in glow sticks can also be extracted using liquid carbon dioxide (CO_{2}) as an environmentally friendly or green solvent. In this case, non polar dyes would dissolve in the liquid CO_{2} and other dyes would be attracted to cotton.

== See also ==
- Retardation factor
