= 2-Chloro-9,10-bis(phenylethynyl)anthracene =

- Skeletal formula

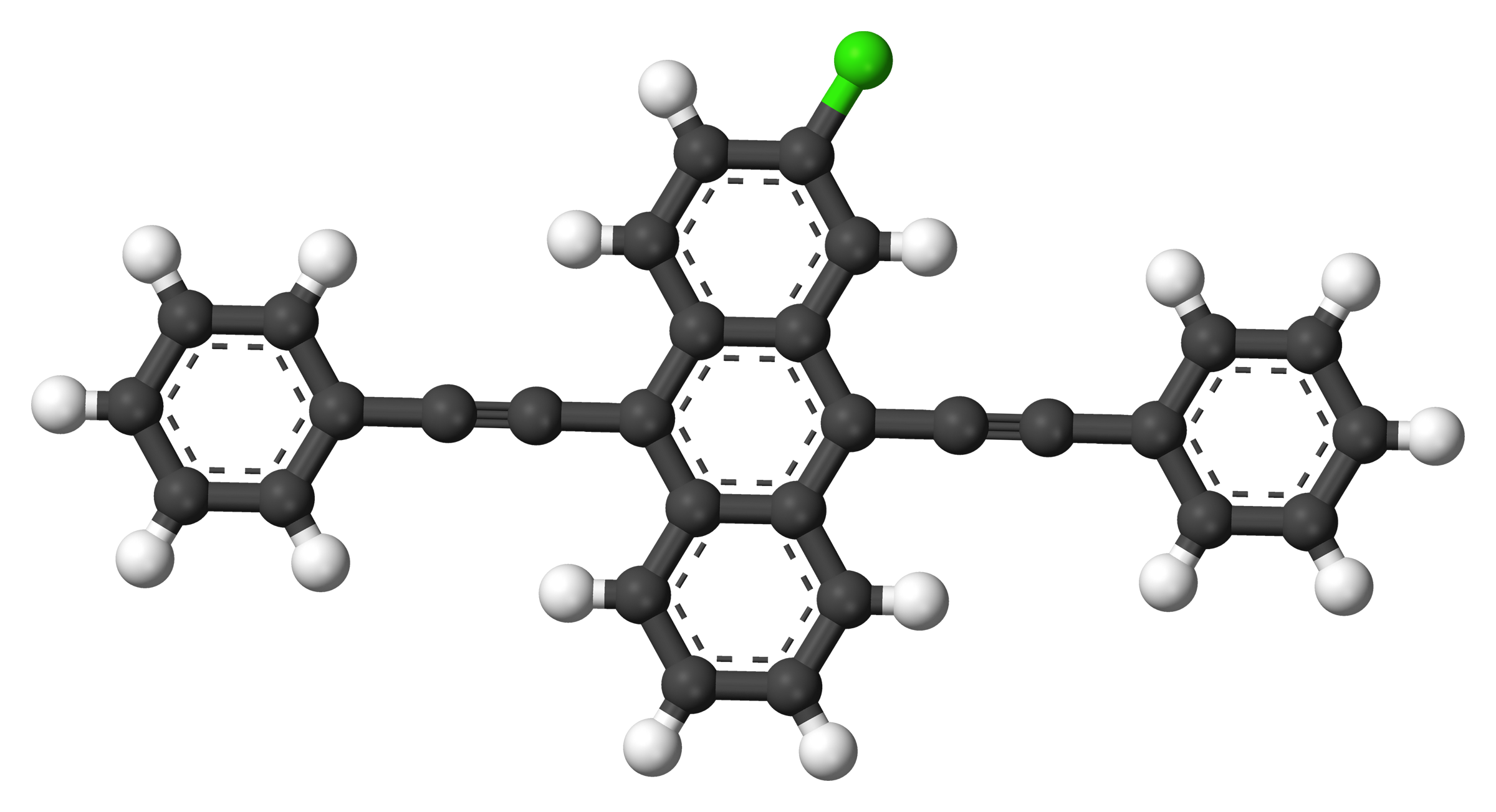
- Ball-and-stick model

Names
- Preferred IUPAC name 2-Chloro-9,10-bis(phenylethynyl)anthracene
- Other names 2-Chloro-BPEA

Identifiers
CAS Number	41105-36-6
3D model (JSmol)	Interactive image; Interactive image
ChemSpider	286153
ECHA InfoCard	100.152.467
EC Number	623-822-7
PubChem CID	323135
UNII	7MU5L6P7KZ
CompTox Dashboard (EPA)	DTXSID70314308
- InChI: InChI=1S/C30H17Cl/c31-24-17-20-29-27(18-15-22-9-3-1-4-10-22)25-13-7-8-14-26(25)28(30(29)21-24)19-16-23-11-5-2-6-12-23/h1-14,17,20-21H Key: YDYTTZZBQVZTPY-UHFFFAOYSA-N; InChI=1/C30H17Cl/c31-24-17-20-29-27(18-15-22-9-3-1-4-10-22)25-13-7-8-14-26(25)28(30(29)21-24)19-16-23-11-5-2-6-12-23/h1-14,17,20-21H Key: YDYTTZZBQVZTPY-UHFFFAOYAF
- SMILES: c1ccc(cc1)C#Cc2c3ccc(cc3c(c4ccccc42)C#Cc5ccccc5)Cl; Clc5ccc4c(C#Cc1ccccc1)c2ccccc2c(C#Cc3ccccc3)c4c5

Properties
Chemical formula	C_{30}H_{17}Cl
Molar mass	412.91 g/mol
Melting point	224 to 226 °C (435 to 439 °F; 497 to 499 K)

Hazards
- GHS labelling
Pictograms	(GHS07: Exclamation mark)
Signal word	Warning
Hazard statements	H315, H319, H335
Precautionary statements	P261, P264, P271, P280, P302+P352, P304+P340, P305+P351+P338, P312, P321, P332+P313, P337+P313, P362, P403+P233, P405, P501
- Except where otherwise noted, data are given for materials in their standard state (at 25 °C [77 °F], 100 kPa). verify (what is ?) Infobox references

2-Chloro-9,10-bis(phenylethynyl)anthracene is a fluorescent dye used in lightsticks. It emits green light, used in 12-hour low-intensity Cyalume sticks.

== See also ==
- 9,10-Bis(phenylethynyl)anthracene
- 1-Chloro-9,10-bis(phenylethynyl)anthracene
