= MCPO =

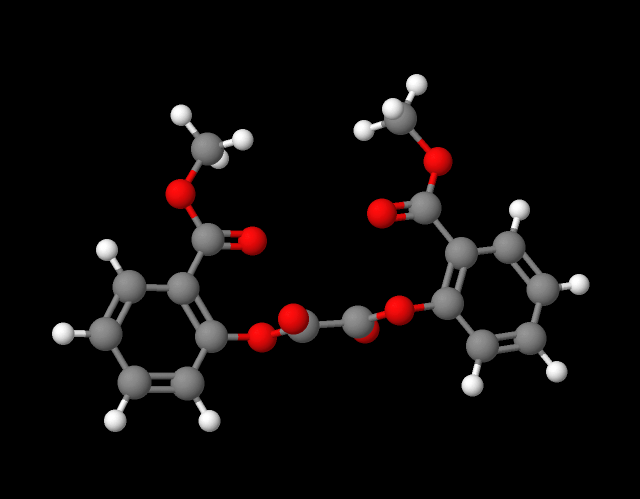

Names
- Preferred IUPAC name Bis[2-(methoxycarbonyl)phenyl] oxalate

Identifiers
CAS Number	2253964-52-0
3D model (JSmol)	Interactive image
ChemSpider	103873712
PubChem CID	139033637
UNII	GK28JNK336
CompTox Dashboard (EPA)	DTXSID901350156
- InChI: InChI=1S/C18H14O8/c1-23-15(19)11-7-3-5-9-13(11)25-17(21)18(22)26-14-10-6-4-8-12(14)16(20)24-2/h3-10H,1-2H3 Key: QUXQUIHALSYBKJ-UHFFFAOYSA-N
- SMILES: COC(=O)C1=C(OC(=O)C(=O)OC2=C(C=CC=C2)C(=O)OC)C=CC=C1

Properties
Chemical formula	C_{18}H_{14}O_{8}
Molar mass	358.302 g·mol^{−1}
- Except where otherwise noted, data are given for materials in their standard state (at 25 °C [77 °F], 100 kPa). Infobox references

MCPO is a chemical compound that can be used to produce chemiluminescence. MCPO is mainly used for its chemiluminescent properties and is most commonly used in demonstrations of chemiluminescence as a safer alternative to TCPO. It is used as an alternative to TCPO due to its safer reaction product of methyl salicylate rather than the product of TCP, 2,4,6-trichlorophenol, a known carcinogen.

== Synthesis ==
MCPO is synthesized by reacting methyl salicylate with oxalyl chloride in a solution of THF and pyridine:

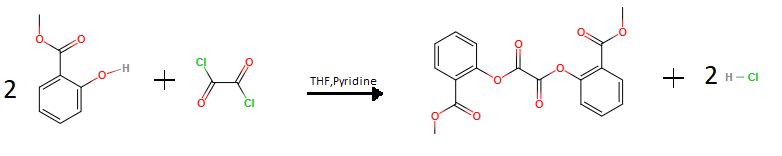

Pyridine reacts with HCl produced forming the THF insoluble pyridine hydrochloride salt. Water is then added to the solution to dissolve the precipitated pyridine HCl and decrease the solubility of the MCPO in solution, causing it to precipitate. The MCPO precipitate is then filtered and washed with water to remove contaminants.

== See also ==
- TCPO
