= 9,10-Bis(phenylethynyl)anthracene =

- Skeletal formula

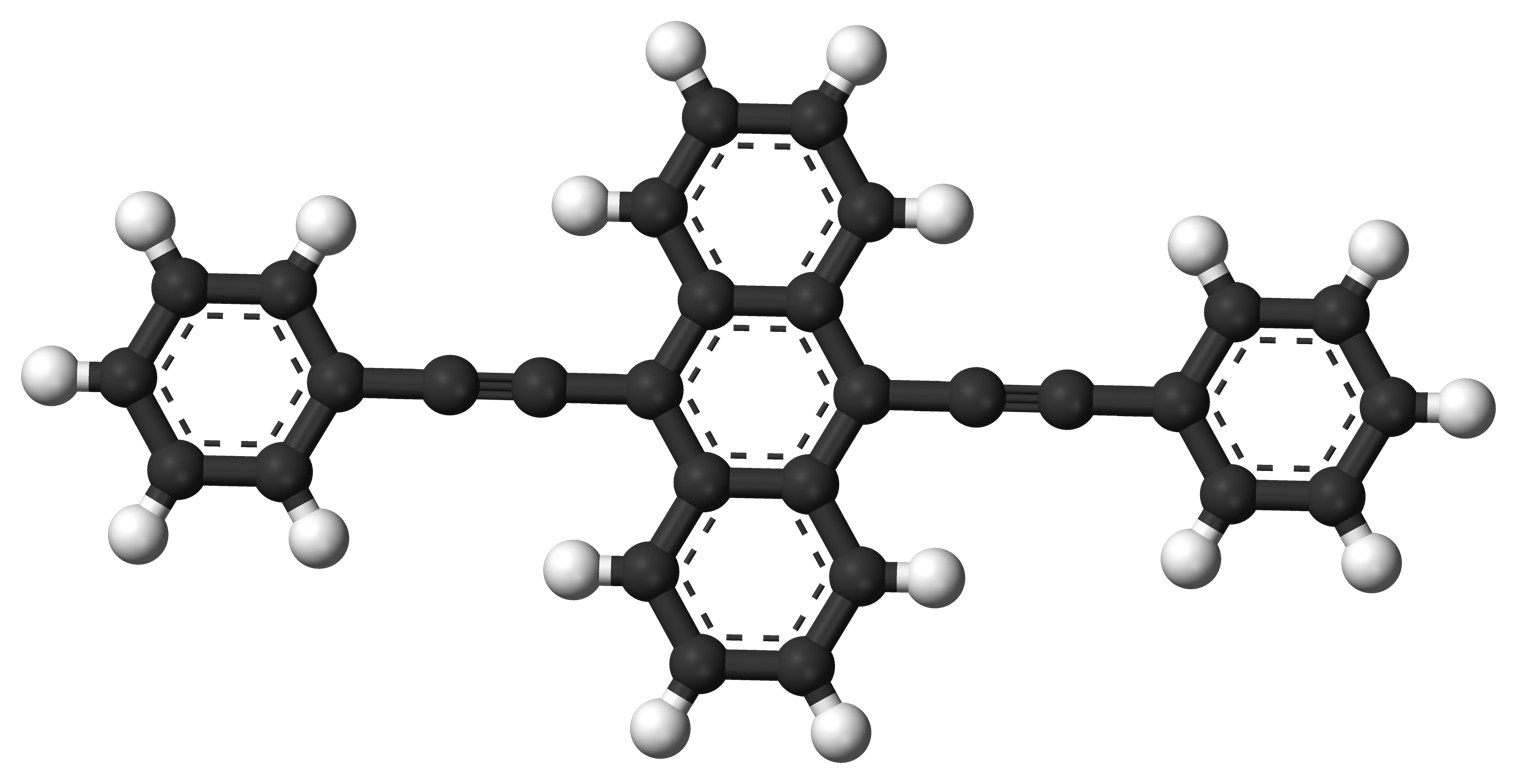
- Ball-and-stick model

Names
- Preferred IUPAC name 9,10-Bis(phenylethynyl)anthracene
- Other names 9,10-Bis(2-phenylethynyl)anthracene, BPEA

Identifiers
CAS Number	10075-85-1
3D model (JSmol)	Interactive image
Beilstein Reference	1891432
ChEBI	CHEBI:51675
ChemSpider	74309
ECHA InfoCard	100.030.178
EC Number	233-210-8
PubChem CID	82338
UNII	FC8JDB70DQ
CompTox Dashboard (EPA)	DTXSID3064936
- InChI: InChI=1S/C30H18/c1-3-11-23(12-4-1)19-21-29-25-15-7-9-17-27(25)30(28-18-10-8-16-26(28)29)22-20-24-13-5-2-6-14-24/h1-18H Key: ZHBOFZNNPZNWGB-UHFFFAOYSA-N; InChI=1/C30H18/c1-3-11-23(12-4-1)19-21-29-25-15-7-9-17-27(25)30(28-18-10-8-16-26(28)29)22-20-24-13-5-2-6-14-24/h1-18H Key: ZHBOFZNNPZNWGB-UHFFFAOYAU
- SMILES: C(#Cc1ccccc1)c4c2ccccc2c(C#Cc3ccccc3)c5ccccc45

Properties
Chemical formula	C_{30}H_{18}
Molar mass	378.473 g/mol
Appearance	Orange needle crystals
Melting point	252 to 258 °C (486 to 496 °F; 525 to 531 K)

Hazards
- Occupational safety and health (OHS/OSH)
Main hazards	Irritant (Xi)
- GHS labelling
Pictograms	(GHS07: Exclamation mark)
Signal word	Warning
Hazard statements	H315, H319, H335
Precautionary statements	P261, P264, P271, P280, P302+P352, P304+P340, P305+P351+P338, P312, P321, P332+P313, P337+P313, P362, P403+P233, P405, P501
- Except where otherwise noted, data are given for materials in their standard state (at 25 °C [77 °F], 100 kPa). verify (what is ?) Infobox references

9,10-Bis(phenylethynyl)anthracene (BPEA) is an aromatic hydrocarbon with the chemical formula is C_{30}H_{18}. It displays strong fluorescence and is used as a chemiluminescent fluorophore with high quantum efficiency.

It is used in lightsticks as a fluorophor producing ghostly green light. It is also used as a dopant for organic semiconductors in OLEDs.

The emission wavelength can be lowered by substituting the anthracene core by halogens or alkyls. 2-ethyl and 1,2-dimethyl substituted BPEAs are also in use.

- 1-chloro-9,10-bis(phenylethynyl)anthracene emits yellow-green light, used in 30-minute high-intensity Cyalume sticks
- 2-chloro-9,10-bis(phenylethynyl)anthracene emits green light, used in 12-hour low-intensity Cyalume sticks

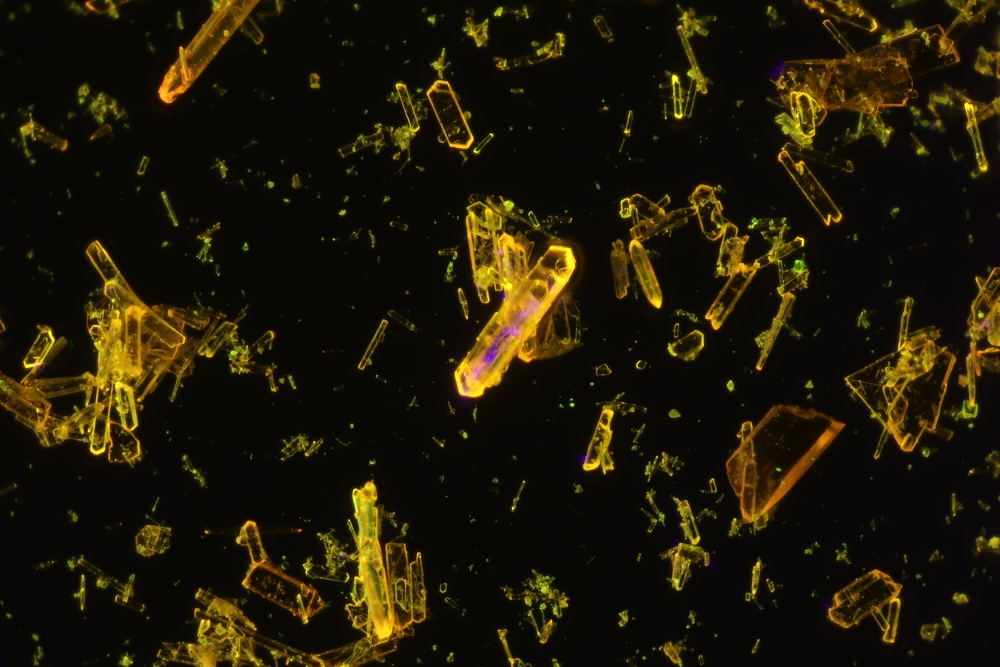
9,10-Bis(phenylethinyl)anthracen

== See also ==
- Lightstick
- Organic light-emitting diode
- 5,12-Bis(phenylethynyl)naphthacene
- 9,10-Diphenylanthracene
