= 5,12-Bis(phenylethynyl)naphthacene =

- Skeletal formula

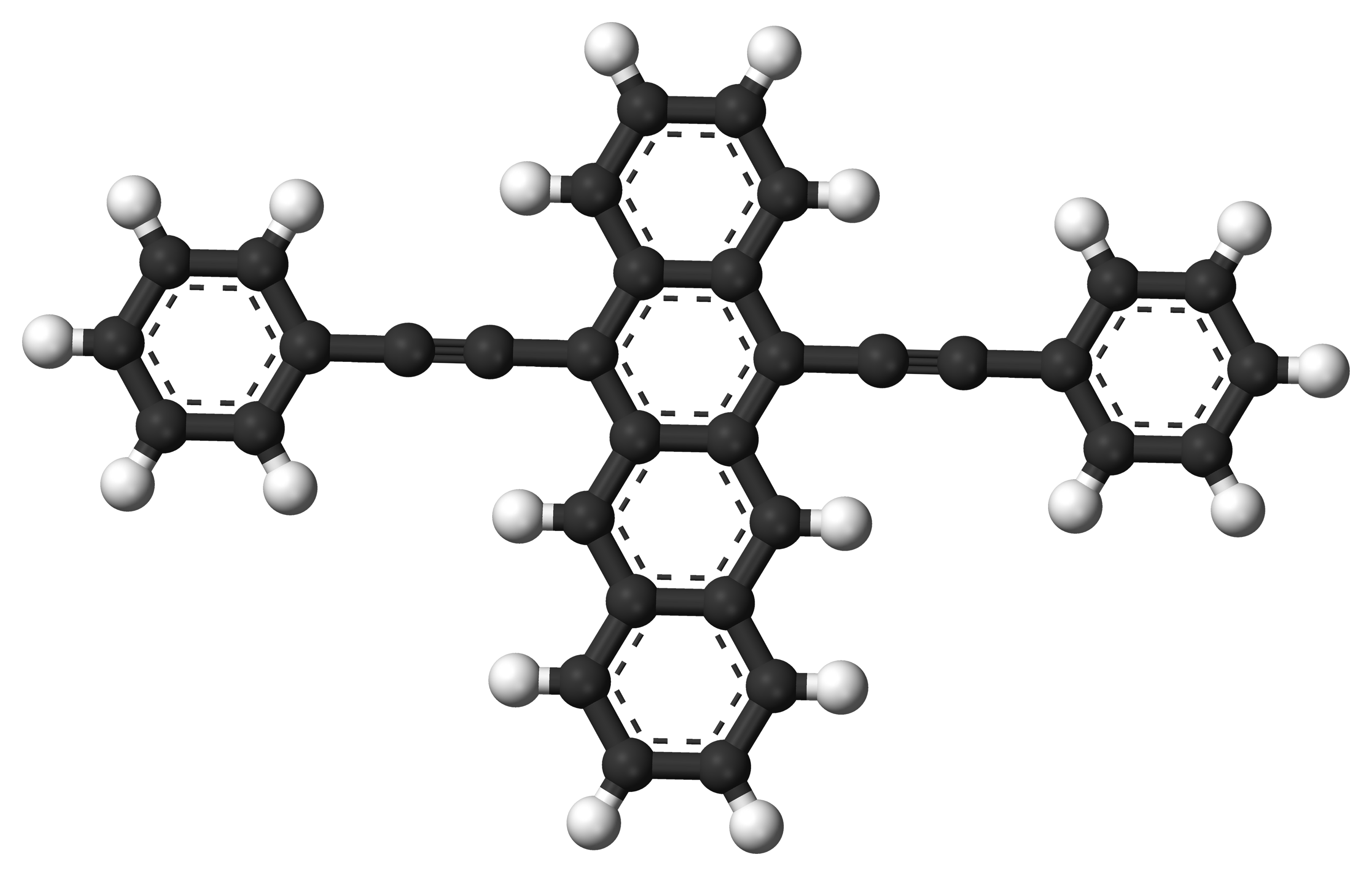
- Ball-and-stick model

Names
- Preferred IUPAC name 5,12-Bis(phenylethynyl)tetracene
- Other names 5,12-Bis(phenylethynyl)naphthacene

Identifiers
| CAS Number | 18826-29-4 |
| 3D model (JSmol) | Interactive image |
| ChemSpider | 79226 |
| ECHA InfoCard | 100.038.717 |
| EC Number | 242-605-4 |
| PubChem CID | 87816 |
| UNII | MKZ3D4QP9D |
| CompTox Dashboard (EPA) | DTXSID3066425 |
- InChI: InChI=1S/C34H20/c1-3-11-25(12-4-1)19-21-31-29-17-9-10-18-30(29)32(22-20-26-13-5-2-6-14-26)34-24-28-16-8-7-15-27(28)23-33(31)34/h1-18,23-24H Key: OUHYGBCAEPBUNA-UHFFFAOYSA-N; Key: OUHYGBCAEPBUNA-UHFFFAOYAO
- SMILES: C(#Cc1ccccc1)c5c2ccccc2c(C#Cc3ccccc3)c6cc4ccccc4cc56

Properties
| Chemical formula | C_{34}H_{20} |
| Molar mass | 428.52 g/mol |
| Melting point | 248 degC |
- Except where otherwise noted, data are given for materials in their standard state (at 25 °C [77 °F], 100 kPa). verify (what is ?) Infobox references

5,12-Bis(phenylethynyl)naphthacene is a fluorescent dye used in lightsticks. It yields orange light.

== See also ==
- 9,10-bis(phenylethynyl)anthracene
