= 1-Chloro-9,10-bis(phenylethynyl)anthracene =

- Skeletal formula

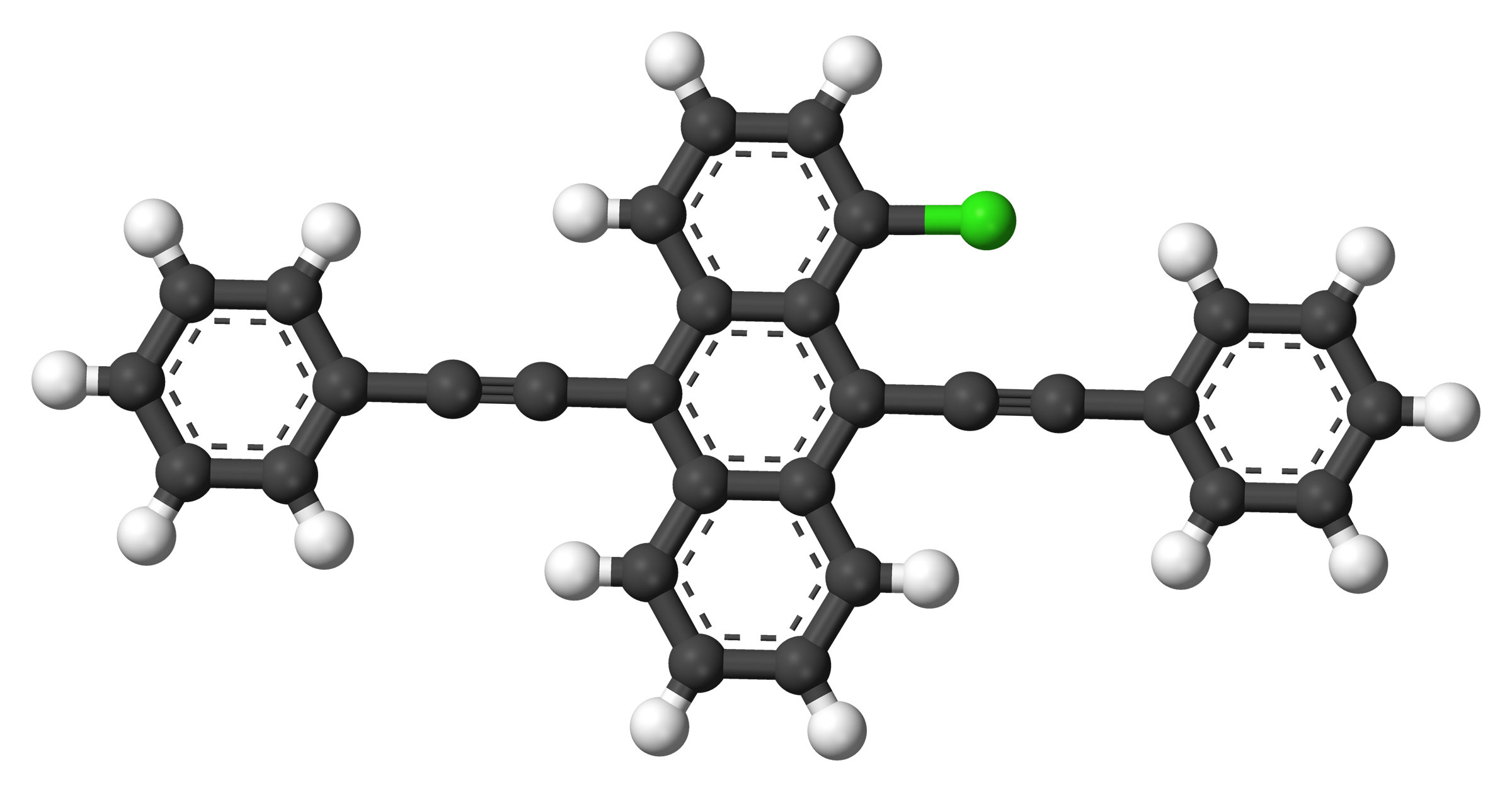
- Ball-and-stick model

Names
- Preferred IUPAC name 1-Chloro-9,10-bis(phenylethynyl)anthracene
- Other names 9,10-Bis(phenylethynyl)-1-chloroanthracene, 1-Chloro-BPEA, 1-Cl-BPEA, CBPEA

Identifiers
CAS Number	41105-35-5
3D model (JSmol)	Interactive image; Interactive image
ChemSpider	149036
ECHA InfoCard	100.050.183
EC Number	255-220-1
PubChem CID	170465
UNII	8N4F8MJ2SL
CompTox Dashboard (EPA)	DTXSID1068279
- InChI: InChI=1S/C30H17Cl/c31-29-17-9-16-27-26(20-18-22-10-3-1-4-11-22)24-14-7-8-15-25(24)28(30(27)29)21-19-23-12-5-2-6-13-23/h1-17H Key: IMMCAKJISYGPDQ-UHFFFAOYSA-N; InChI=1/C30H17Cl/c31-29-17-9-16-27-26(20-18-22-10-3-1-4-11-22)24-14-7-8-15-25(24)28(30(27)29)21-19-23-12-5-2-6-13-23/h1-17H Key: IMMCAKJISYGPDQ-UHFFFAOYAA
- SMILES: c1ccc(cc1)C#Cc2c3cccc(c3c(c4ccccc42)C#Cc5ccccc5)Cl; Clc5cccc4c(C#Cc1ccccc1)c2ccccc2c(C#Cc3ccccc3)c45

Properties
Chemical formula	C_{30}H_{17}Cl
Molar mass	412.91 g/mol
Appearance	Solid
Melting point	199 to 204 °C (390 to 399 °F; 472 to 477 K)

Hazards
- GHS labelling
Pictograms	(GHS07: Exclamation mark)
Signal word	Warning
Hazard statements	H315, H319, H335
Precautionary statements	P261, P264, P271, P280, P302+P352, P304+P340, P305+P351+P338, P312, P321, P332+P313, P337+P313, P362, P403+P233, P405, P501
- Except where otherwise noted, data are given for materials in their standard state (at 25 °C [77 °F], 100 kPa). verify (what is ?) Infobox references

1-Chloro-9,10-bis(phenylethynyl)anthracene is a fluorescent dye used in lightsticks. It emits yellow-green light, used in 30-minute high-intensity Cyalume sticks.

== See also ==
- 9,10-Bis(phenylethynyl)anthracene
- 2-Chloro-9,10-bis(phenylethynyl)anthracene
