= Rubrene =

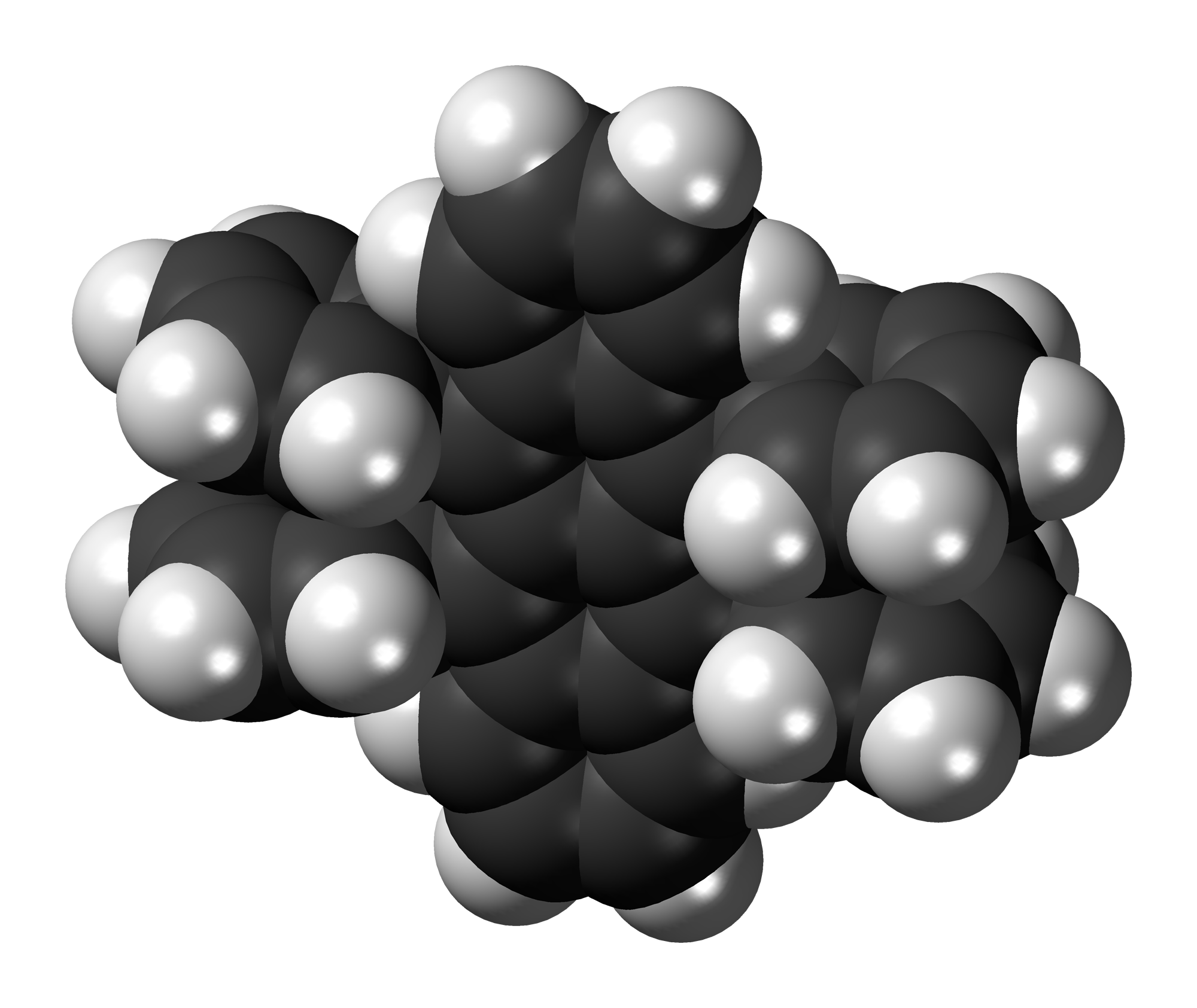

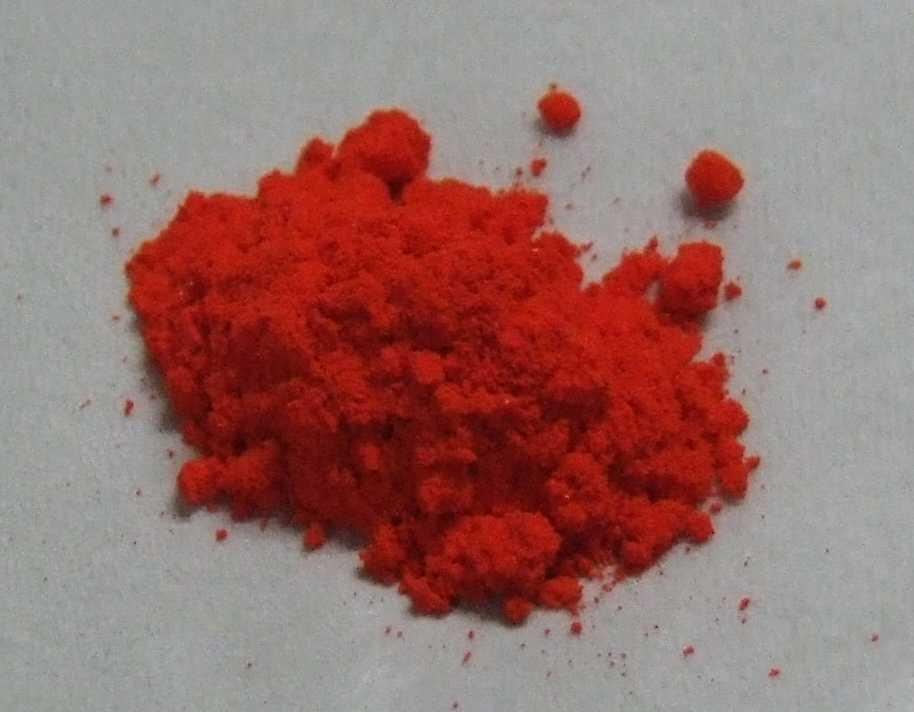

Names
- Preferred IUPAC name 5,6,11,12-Tetraphenyltetracene
- Other names 5,6,11,12-Tetraphenylnaphthacene, rubrene

Identifiers
CAS Number	517-51-1
3D model (JSmol)	Interactive image
ChemSpider	61510
ECHA InfoCard	100.007.494
EC Number	208-242-0
PubChem CID	68203
CompTox Dashboard (EPA)	DTXSID8060161
- InChI: InChI=1S/C42H28/c1-5-17-29(18-6-1)37-33-25-13-14-26-34(33)39(31-21-9-3-10-22-31)42-40(32-23-11-4-12-24-32)36-28-16-15-27-35(36)38(41(37)42)30-19-7-2-8-20-30/h1-28H Key: YYMBJDOZVAITBP-UHFFFAOYSA-N; InChI=1/C42H28/c1-5-17-29(18-6-1)37-33-25-13-14-26-34(33)39(31-21-9-3-10-22-31)42-40(32-23-11-4-12-24-32)36-28-16-15-27-35(36)38(41(37)42)30-19-7-2-8-20-30/h1-28H Key: YYMBJDOZVAITBP-UHFFFAOYAD
- SMILES: c5(c3c(c1ccccc1c(c2ccccc2)c3c(c4ccccc4)c6ccccc56)c7ccccc7)c8ccccc8

Properties
Chemical formula	C_{42}H_{28}
Molar mass	532.7 g/mol
Melting point	315 °C (599 °F; 588 K)
- Except where otherwise noted, data are given for materials in their standard state (at 25 °C [77 °F], 100 kPa). verify (what is ?) Infobox references

Rubrene (5,6,11,12-tetraphenyltetracene) is the organic compound with the formula (C_{18}H_{8}(C_{6}H_{5})_{4}. It is a red colored polycyclic aromatic hydrocarbon. Because of its distinctive optical and electrical properties, rubrene has been extensively studied. It has been used as a sensitiser in chemoluminescence and as a yellow light source in lightsticks.

== Electronic properties ==
As an organic semiconductor, rubrene has been described as a "super star". Like almost many organic electronic materials, rubrene remains in the ranks of promising, not commercial. It has been intensively investigated for applications in organic light-emitting diodes (OLEDs) and organic field-effect transistors, which are the core elements of flexible displays. Single-crystal transistors have hole conductivities of 15 cm^{2}/V^{.}s. The high hole mobility is observed for single crystals, not films, which would be of greater interest. Rubrene is also susceptible to oxidative degradation.

Many variants of rubrene have been prepared to improve prospects for device applications.

== Crystal structure ==
Several polymorphs of rubrene are known. Crystals grown from vapor in vacuum can be monoclinic, triclinic, and orthorhombic motifs. Orthorhombic crystals (space group B_{bam}) are obtained in a closed system in a two-zone furnace at ambient pressure.

== Synthesis ==
Rubrene is prepared by treating 1,1,3-Triphenyl-2-propyn-1-ol with thionyl chloride.

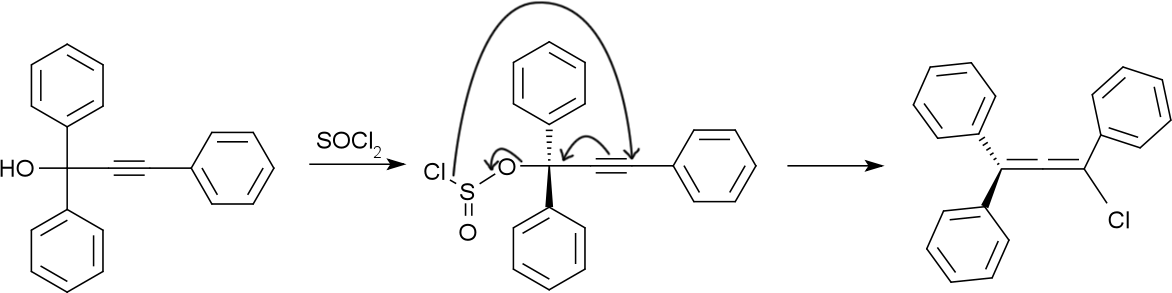

The resulting chloroallene undergoes dimerization and dehydrochlorination to give rubrene.

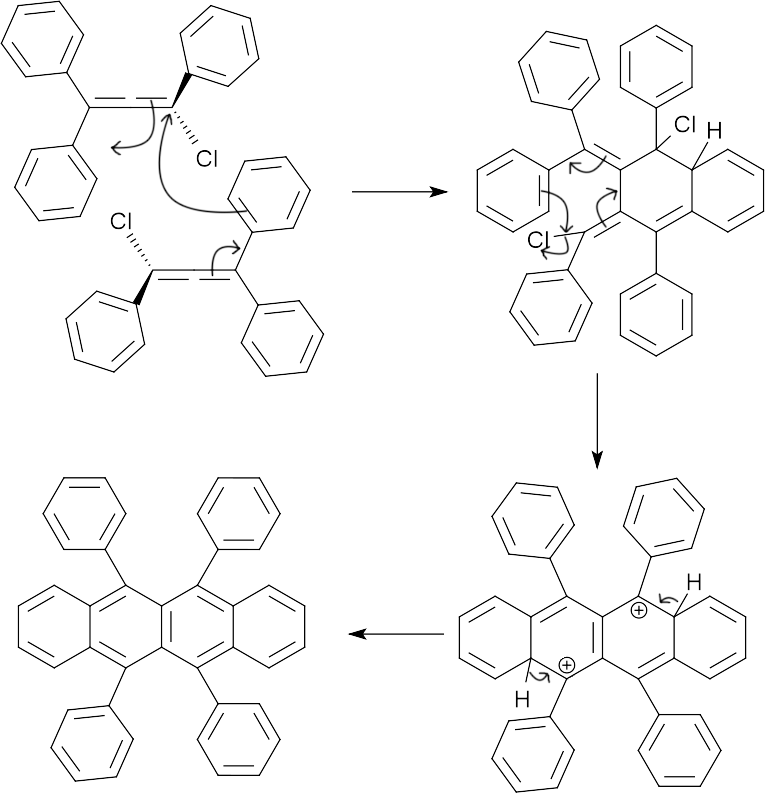

== Redox properties ==
Rubrene, like other polycyclic aromatic molecules, undergoes redox reactions in solution. It oxidizes and reduces reversibly at 0.95 V and −1.37 V, respectively vs SCE. When the cation and anion are co-generated in an electrochemical cell, they can combine with annihilation of their charges, but producing an excited rubrene molecule that emits at 540 nm. This phenomenon is called electrochemiluminescence.
