= 1,3-Dioxetanedione =

- Skeletal formula of 1,3-dioxetanedione

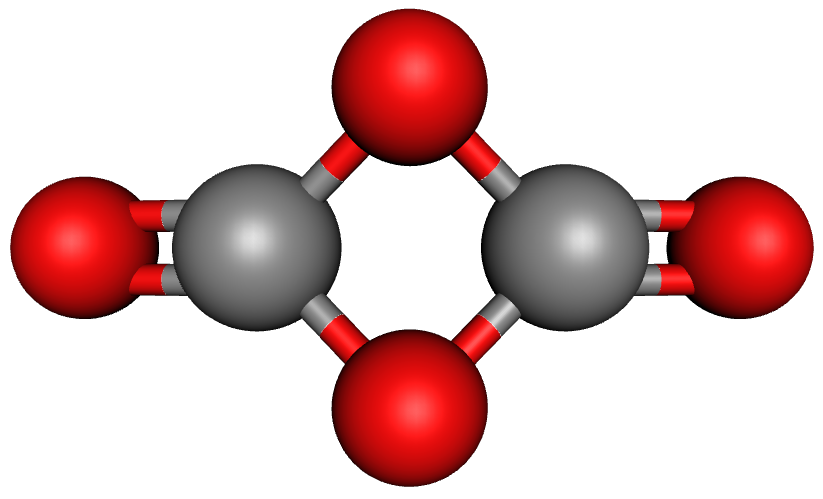

Names
- Preferred IUPAC name 1,3-Dioxetanedione
- Other names Dicarbonic anhydride

Identifiers
3D model (JSmol)	Interactive image
ChemSpider	65322075
PubChem CID	17801328
CompTox Dashboard (EPA)	DTXSID201028554
- InChI: InChI=1S/C2O4/c3-1-5-2(4)6-1 Key: IUPJSFOHUQGEDR-UHFFFAOYSA-N
- SMILES: O=C1OC(=O)O1

Properties
Chemical formula	C_{2}O_{4}
Molar mass	88.018 g·mol^{−1}
- Except where otherwise noted, data are given for materials in their standard state (at 25 °C [77 °F], 100 kPa). verify (what is ?) Infobox references

The chemical compound 1,3-dioxetanedione, or 1,3-dioxacyclobutane-2,4-dione, also known as dicarbonic anhydride, is a hypothetical oxide of carbon with formula C_{2}O_{4}. It can be considered a cyclic dimer of carbon dioxide (CO_{2}) or as a double ketone of 1,3-dioxetane (1,3-dioxacyclobutane).

Theoretical calculations indicate that the compound would be extremely unstable at room temperature (half-life of less than 1.1 μs) but may be stable at −196 °C.
