= Glow stick =

Self-contained, short-term light source

1. The plastic casing covers the inner fluid.; 2. The glass capsule covers the solution.; 3. Diphenyl oxalate and fluorescent dye solution; 4. Hydrogen peroxide solution; 5. After the glass capsule is broken and the solutions mix, the glow stick glows.

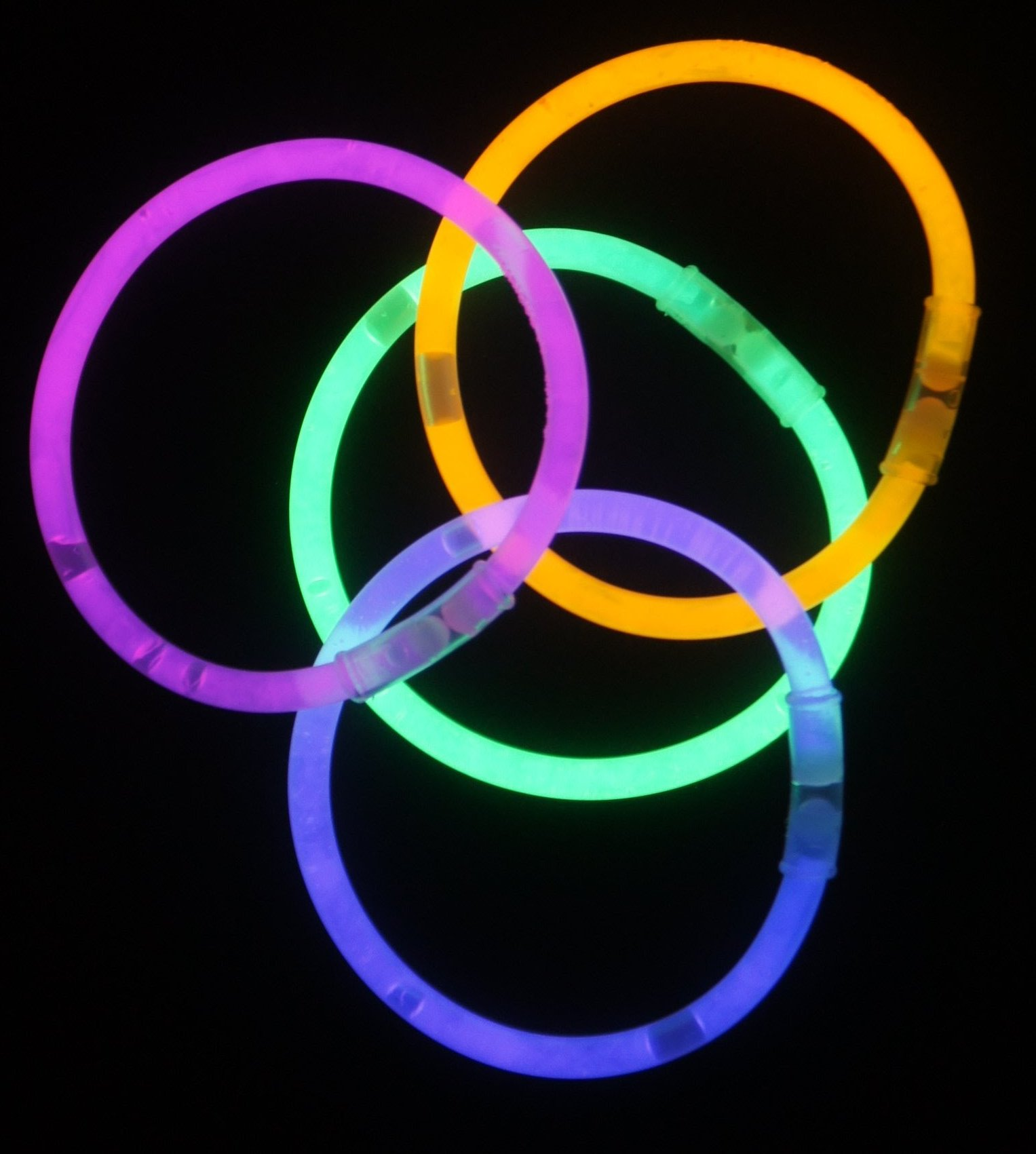
Different color glow sticks meant for use as bracelets

A glow stick, also known as a light stick, chem light, light wand, light rod, and rave light, is a self-contained, short-term light source. It consists of a translucent plastic tube containing isolated substances that, when combined, produce light through chemiluminescence. The light cannot be turned off and can be used only once. The used tube is then thrown away. Glow sticks are often used for recreation, such as for events, camping, outdoor exploration, and concerts. Glow sticks are also used for light in power outage, military and emergency services applications. Industrial uses include marine, transportation, and mining.

== History ==
Bis(2,4,5-trichloro-6-(pentyloxycarbonyl)phenyl)oxalate, trademarked "Vacume", was invented in 1971 by Michael M. Rauhut, of American Cyanamid, based on work by Edwin A. Chandross and David Iba Sr. of Bell Labs.

Other early work on chemiluminescence was carried out at the same time, by researchers under Herbert Richter at China Lake Naval Weapons Center.

Several US patents for glow stick-type devices were issued in 1973–74. A later 1976 patent recommended a single glass ampoule that is suspended in a second substance, that when broken and mixed together, provide the chemiluminescent light. The design also included a stand for the signal device so it could be thrown from a moving vehicle and remain standing in an upright position on the road. The idea was this would replace traditional emergency roadside flares and would be superior, since it was not a fire hazard, would be easier and safer to deploy, and would not be made ineffective if struck by passing vehicles. This design, with its single glass ampoule inside a plastic tube filled with a second substance that when bent breaks the glass and then is shaken to mix the substances, most closely resembles the typical glow stick sold today.

American Cyanamid sold its chemical light division in 1993 to Omniglow, a manufacturer of chemiluminescent products.

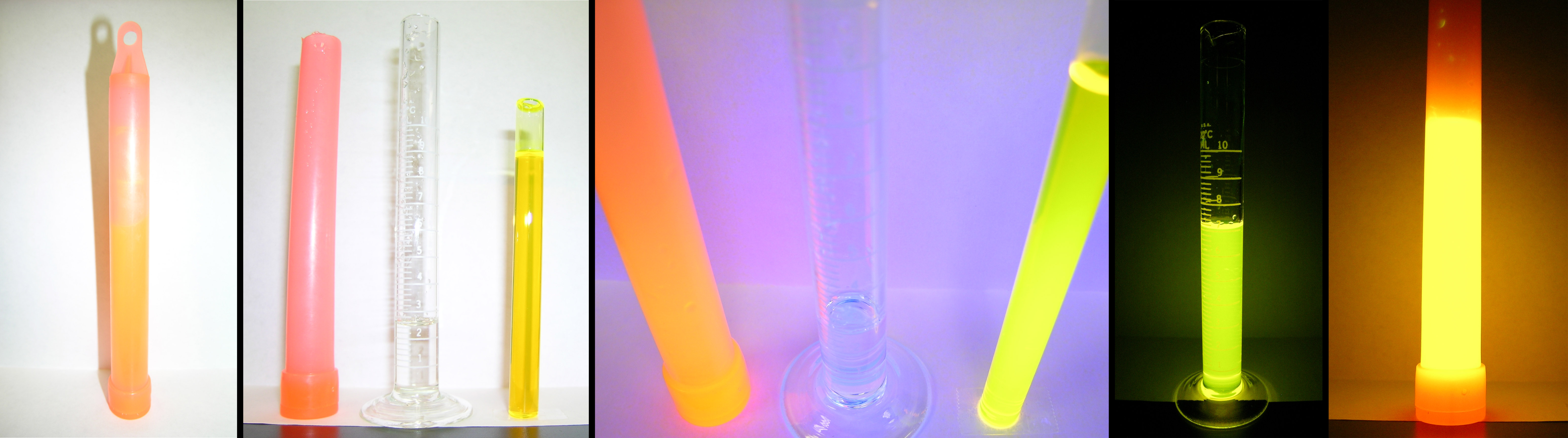
Disassembly of a chemoluminescent glow stick, from left to right: (1) original, intact lightstick; (2) opened glow stick with peroxide mixture poured into a graduated cylinder and glass ampoule of fluorophore removed; (3) all three under UV illumination showing fluorophore fluorescence and plastic container fluorescence; (4) chemoluminescence of mixed substances in the graduated cylinder; (5) the mixture returned to the original plastic container, showing a slightly different (more orange) color of light emission.

== Uses ==
Glow sticks are waterproof, do not use batteries, consume no oxygen, generate no or negligible heat, produce neither spark nor flame, can tolerate high pressures such as those found under water, are inexpensive, and are reasonably disposable. This makes them ideal as light sources and light markers by military forces, campers, spelunkers, and recreational divers.

=== Entertainment ===
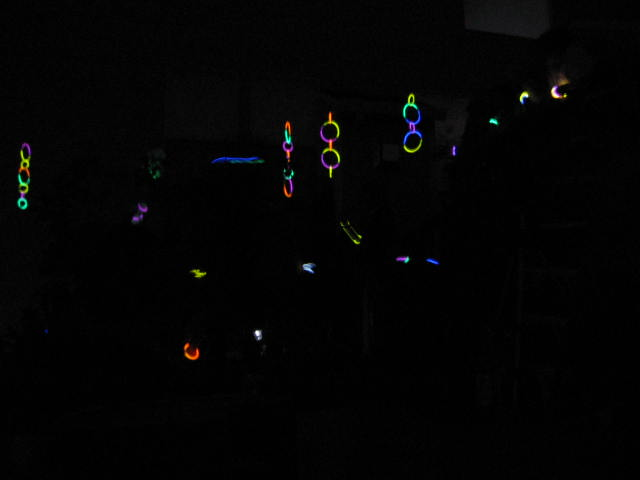
Party decor

Glowsticking is the use of glow sticks in dancing (such as in glow poi and wotagei). They are frequently used for entertainment at parties (in particular raves), concerts, and dance clubs. They are used by marching band conductors for evening performances; glow sticks are also used in festivals and celebrations around the world. Glow sticks also serve multiple functions as toys, readily visible night-time warnings to motorists, and luminous markings that enable parents to keep track of their children. Another use is for balloon-carried light effects. Glow sticks are also used to create special effects in low light photography and film.

The Guinness Book of Records recorded the world's largest glow stick was cracked at 150 metres (492 ft 2 in) tall. It was created by the University of Wisconsin–Whitewater's Chemistry Department to celebrate the school's sesquicentennial, or 150th birthday in Whitewater, Wisconsin and cracked on 9 September 2018.

=== Recreation and survival ===
Glow sticks are used for outdoor recreation, often used at night for marking. Scuba divers use diving-rated glow sticks to mark themselves during night dives. This is done to enable visibility of bioluminescent marine organisms, which cannot be seen while a bright dive light is illuminated. Glow sticks are used on backpacks, tent pegs, and on jackets during overnight camping expeditions. Often, glow sticks are recommended as an addition to survival kits.

=== Industry ===
There are specific industrial uses of glow sticks, which are often used as a light source in circumstances where electric lighting and LEDs are not best suited. For example, in the mining industry, glow sticks are required for emergency evacuation in the case of a gas leak. Use of an electric light source in this case may cause an unintended explosion. Chemiluminescence, the type of light used in glow sticks, is a "cold-light" and does not use electricity, and will not cause a gas leak to ignite.

Glow sticks are also used worldwide in the marine industry, often used as fishing lures in long-line, recreational, and commercial fishing, as well as for personal safety.

=== Military ===
Glow sticks were invented under the auspices of the US military, and are an essential part of military operations across land and sea, where they are more often referred to as chem lights. Glow sticks are also used within police tactical units, as light sources during night operations or close-quarters combat in dark areas. They are also used to mark secured areas or objects of note. When worn, they can be used to identify friendly soldiers during nighttime operations. For search and rescue operations, glow sticks are often used during Man Overboard rescue scenarios to create a glowing trail back to the last known location of someone who is lost at sea.

=== Emergency services ===
Glow sticks are used by police, fire, and emergency medical services as light sources, similar to their military applications. Often, emergency rescue crews will hand out glow sticks in order to keep track of people at night, who may not have access to their own lighting. Glow sticks are sometimes attached to life vests and lifeboats on passenger and commercial vessels, to ensure night time visibility.

Glow sticks are often part of emergency kits to provide basic lighting and provide ease of identification in dark areas. They can be found in emergency lighting kits in buildings, public transportation vehicles, and subway stations.

== Operation ==
Glow sticks emit light when two chemicals are mixed. The reaction between the two chemicals is catalyzed by a base, usually sodium salicylate. The sticks consist of a tiny, brittle container within a flexible outer container. Each container holds a different solution. When the outer container is flexed, the inner container breaks, allowing the solutions to combine, causing the necessary chemical reaction. After breaking, the tube is shaken to thoroughly mix the components.

The glow stick contains two chemicals, a base catalyst, and a suitable dye (photosensitizer, or fluorophor). This creates an exergonic reaction. The chemicals inside the plastic tube are a mixture of the dye, the base catalyst, and diphenyl oxalate. The chemical in the glass vial is hydrogen peroxide. By mixing the peroxide with the phenyl oxalate ester, a chemical reaction takes place, yielding two moles of phenol and one mole of peroxyacid ester (1,2-dioxetanedione). The peroxyacid decomposes spontaneously to carbon dioxide, releasing energy that excites the dye, which then relaxes by releasing a photon. The wavelength of the photon—the color of the emitted light—depends on the structure of the dye. The reaction releases energy mostly as light, with very little heat. The reason for this is that the reverse [2 + 2] photocycloadditions of 1,2-dioxetanedione is a forbidden transition (it violates Woodward–Hoffmann rules) and cannot proceed through a regular thermal mechanism.

Oxidation of an diphenyl oxalate (top), decomposition of 1,2-dioxetanedione (middle), relaxation of dye (lower)

By adjusting the concentrations of the two chemicals and the base, manufacturers can produce glow sticks that glow either brightly for a short amount of time or more dimly for an extended length of time. This also allows glow sticks to perform satisfactorily in hot or cold climates, by compensating for the temperature dependence of reaction. At maximum concentration (typically found only in laboratory settings), mixing the chemicals results in a furious reaction, producing large amounts of light for only a few seconds. The same effect can be achieved by adding copious amounts of sodium salicylate or other bases. Heating a glow stick also causes the reaction to proceed faster and the glow stick to glow more brightly for a brief period. Cooling a glow stick slows the reaction a small amount and causes it to last longer, but the light is dimmer. This can be demonstrated by refrigerating or freezing an active glow stick; when it warms up again, it will resume glowing. The dyes used in glow sticks usually exhibit fluorescence when exposed to ultraviolet radiation—even a spent glow stick may therefore shine under a black light.

The light intensity is high immediately after activation, then exponentially decays. Leveling of this initial high output is possible by refrigerating the glow stick before activation.

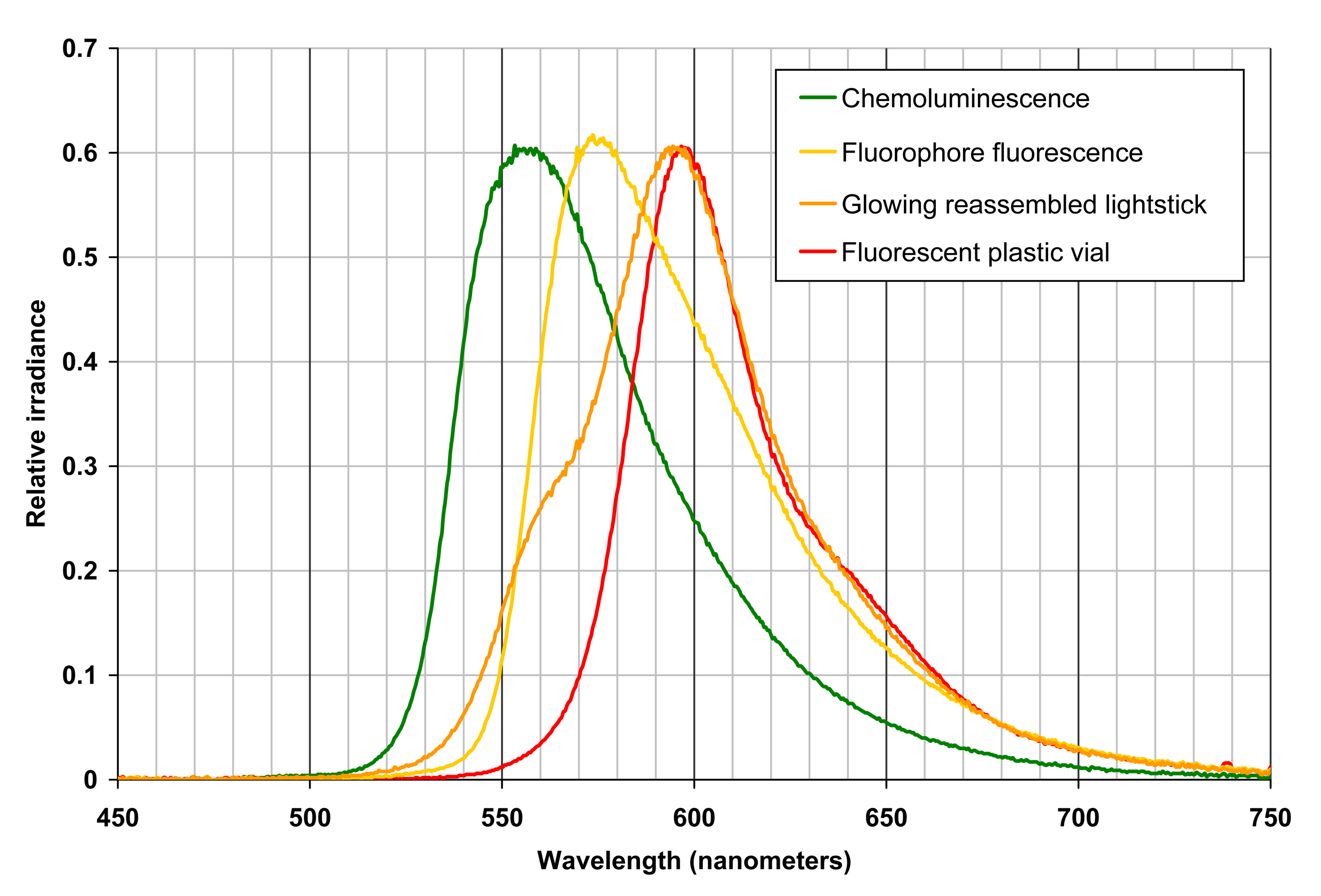
Spectral emission of chemiluminescence (green line) of mixed fluorophore and peroxide, which was removed from an orange glow stick, fluorescence of liquid fluorophore in glass ampoule only (before mixing) while under black light (yellow-orange line), fluorescence of plastic outer container of orange glow stick under black light (red line), and spectrum of reassembled chemiluminescent glow stick (glowing liquid poured back into original orange plastic vial) (darker orange line). This plot thus shows that the orange light from an orange glow stick (identical to the one in the above glow stick disassembly image) is created by a greenish-yellow light emitting chemoluminescent liquid partially inducing fluorescence in (and being filtered by) an orange plastic container.

A combination of two fluorophores can be used, with one in the solution and another incorporated to the walls of the container. This is advantageous when the second fluorophore would degrade in solution or be attacked by the chemicals. The emission spectrum of the first fluorophore and the absorption spectrum of the second one have to largely overlap, and the first one has to emit at shorter wavelength than the second one. A downconversion from ultraviolet to visible is possible, as is conversion between visible wavelengths (e.g., green to orange) or visible to near-infrared. The shift can be as much as 200 nm, but usually the range is about 20–100 nm longer than the absorption spectrum. Glow sticks using this approach tend to have colored containers, due to the dye embedded in the plastic. Infrared glow sticks may appear dark-red to black, as the dyes absorb the visible light produced inside the container and reemit near-infrared.

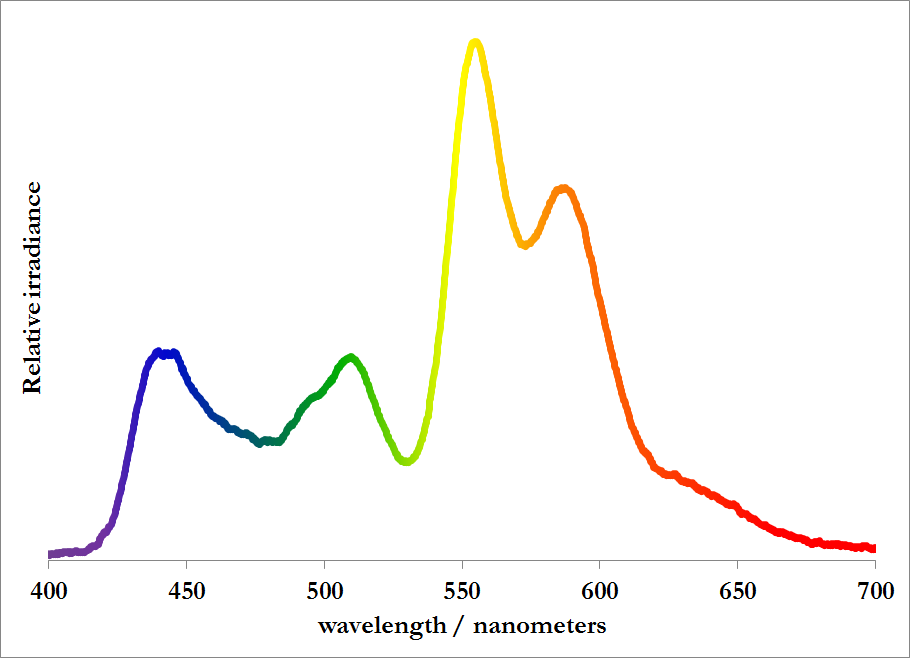
Light emitted from a white glow stick. Four or five peaks are observed in the spectrum, suggesting the presence of four or five different fluorophores contained in the glow stick.

On the other hand, various colors can also be achieved by simply mixing several fluorophores within the solution to achieve the desired effect. These various colors can be achieved due to the principles of additive color. For example, a combination of red, yellow, and green fluorophores is used in orange light sticks, and a combination of several fluorescers is used in white light sticks.

=== Fluorophores used ===
- 9,10-Diphenylanthracene (DPA) emits blue light
- 9-(2-Phenylethenyl) anthracene emits teal light
- 1-Chloro-9,10-diphenylanthracene (1-chloro(DPA)) and 2-chloro-9,10-diphenylanthracene (2-chloro(DPA)) emit blue-green light more efficiently than nonsubstituted DPA
- 9,10-Bis(phenylethynyl)anthracene (BPEA) emits green light with maximum at 486 nm
- 1-Chloro-9,10-bis(phenylethynyl)anthracene emits yellow-green light, used in 30-minute high-intensity Cyalume sticks
- 2-Chloro-9,10-bis(phenylethynyl)anthracene emits green light, used in 12-hour low-intensity Cyalume sticks
- 1,8-Dichloro-9,10-bis(phenylethynyl)anthracene emits yellow light, used in Cyalume sticks
- Rubrene emits orange-yellow at 550 nm
- 2,4-Di-tert-butylphenyl 1,4,5,8-tetracarboxynaphthalene diamide emits deep red light, together with DPA is used to produce white or hot-pink light, depending on their ratio
- Rhodamine B emits red light. It is rarely used, as it breaks down in contact with CPPO, shortening the shelf life of the mixture.
- 5,12-Bis(phenylethynyl)naphthacene emits orange light
- Violanthrone emits orange light at 630 nm
- 16,17-(1,2-Ethylenedioxy)violanthrone emits red at 680 nm
- 16,17-Dihexyloxyviolanthrone emits infrared at 725 nm
- 16,17-Butyloxyviolanthrone emits infrared
- N,N′-Bis(2,5,-di-tert-butylphenyl)-3,4,9,10-perylenedicarboximide emits red
- 1-(N,N-Dibutylamino)anthracene emits infrared
- 6-Methylacridinium iodide emits infrared
9,10-Diphenylanthracene yields blue light

9,10-Bis(phenylethynyl)anthracene yields green light

1-Chloro-9,10-bis(phenylethynyl)anthracene yields yellow-green light

Rubrene (5,6,11,12-tetraphenylnaphthacene) yields yellow light

5,12-Bis(phenylethynyl)naphthacene yields orange light

Rhodamine 6G yields orange light

Rhodamine B yields red light

== Consumer safety issues and warnings ==
=== Toxicity ===
In glow sticks, phenol is produced as a byproduct. Experts have advised consumers to keep the mixture away from skin and to prevent accidental ingestion if the glow stick case splits or breaks. If spilled on skin, the chemicals could cause skin irritation, swelling, or, in extreme circumstances, vomiting and nausea. Some of the chemicals used in older glow sticks are carcinogens. The sensitizers used are polynuclear aromatic hydrocarbons, a class of compounds known for their carcinogenic properties.

Dibutyl phthalate, a plasticizer sometimes used in glow sticks (and many plastics), has raised some health concerns. It was put on California's list of suspected teratogens in 2006. Glow stick liquid contains ingredients that can act as a plasticizer, softening plastics onto which it leaks. Diphenyl oxalate can sting and burn eyes, irritate and sting skin and can burn the mouth and throat if ingested.

Researchers in Brazil, concerned about waste from glowsticks used in fishing in their country, published a study in 2014 on this topic. It measured the secondary reactions that continue within used glow sticks, toxicity to cells in culture, and chemical reactions with DNA in vitro. The authors found high toxicity of light stick solutions, and evidence of reactivity with DNA. They concluded that light stick solutions "are hazardous and that the health risks associated with exposure have not yet been properly evaluated."

Many glow sticks use the chemical TCPO, or trichlorophenol, which is highly toxic if inhaled or ingested and is toxic to organs if ingested or otherwise exposed.

=== Legal issues and consumer protection law violations ===
A Danish Ministry of the Environment report investigated commercially available glow sticks and found evidence of glow sticks containing dibutyl pthalate, and concluded that this is in violation of the law. From the report "that substance must not be used in toys or gimmick and gag articles as according to classification it may damage fertility or the unborn child. The risk arises after repeated or longer exposure." In this consumer investigation, it was also observed that certain glow stick packaging featured images of children on the front, while the back carried a warning label stating "not suitable for children." This inconsistency may lead to consumer confusion and raises questions regarding appropriate product marketing and safety communication. Products on Amazon can be marketed as child-safe and non-toxic, but these claims are unvalidated.

=== Single-use plastics ===
Glow sticks also contribute to the plastic waste problem, as glow sticks are single-use items and made from plastic. Additionally, since the inner vial is often made from glass and the chemicals inside are dangerous if improperly handled, the plastic used for glow sticks is non-recoverable by recycling services, so glow sticks are categorized as non-recyclable waste.

Safety data sheets for individual components of glow stick formulas recommend absorbing with sawdust or other absorbent material and in particular stress the importance of keeping waste away from water sources. They also advise against dumping used glow stick fluid down the drain.

== Safety improvements ==
By the 2020s, work was being done to create safer glow sticks. Canadian company Lux Bio has developed two alternative glow sticks: the Light Wand, which is biodegradable and powered with bioluminescence, rather than chemiluminescence, and LÜMI, which is a reusable and non-toxic glow stick that glows with phosphorescence and is chemically and biologically inert.

== See also ==
- Chemiluminescence
- Bioluminescence
- Glowmatography
- Photoluminescence
- Tritium illumination
- Flare
