= 9,10-Diphenylanthracene =

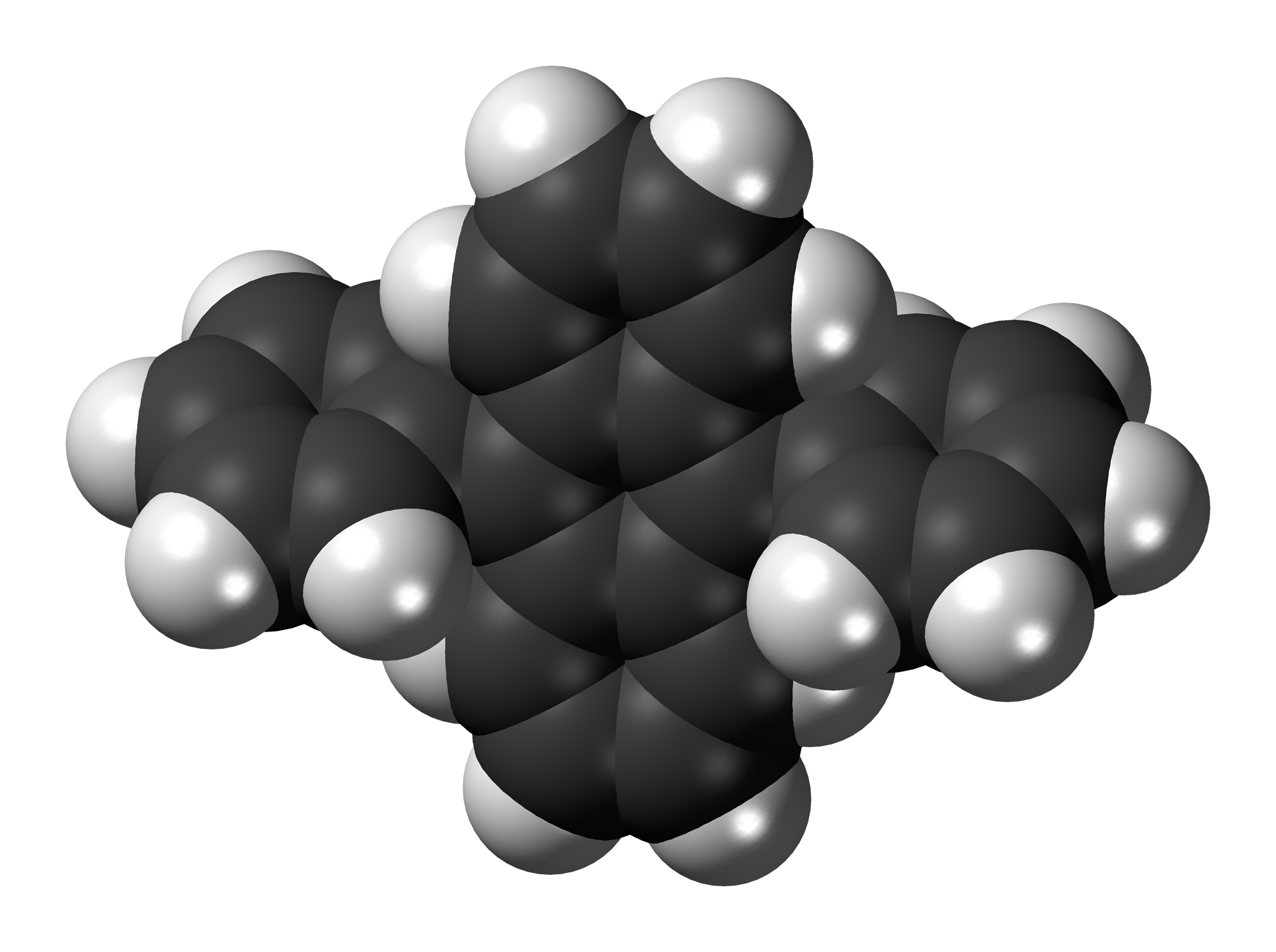

Names
- IUPAC name 9,10-Diphenylanthracene

Identifiers
CAS Number	1499-10-1
3D model (JSmol)	Interactive image; Interactive image
Abbreviations	DPA
Beilstein Reference	1914010
ChEBI	CHEBI:51676
ChemSpider	14430
ECHA InfoCard	100.014.641
EC Number	216-105-1
PubChem CID	15159
UNII	51BQ8IYQ9U
CompTox Dashboard (EPA)	DTXSID1061734
- InChI: InChI=1S/C26H18/c1-3-11-19(12-4-1)25-21-15-7-9-17-23(21)26(20-13-5-2-6-14-20)24-18-10-8-16-22(24)25/h1-18H Key: FCNCGHJSNVOIKE-UHFFFAOYSA-N; InChI=1/C26H18/c1-3-11-19(12-4-1)25-21-15-7-9-17-23(21)26(20-13-5-2-6-14-20)24-18-10-8-16-22(24)25/h1-18H Key: FCNCGHJSNVOIKE-UHFFFAOYAL
- SMILES: c4c3c(c1ccccc1c(c2ccccc2)c3ccc4)c5ccccc5; c1ccc(cc1)c2c3ccccc3c(c4c2cccc4)c5ccccc5

Properties
Chemical formula	C_{26}H_{18}
Molar mass	330.42
Appearance	Yellow powder
Density	1.22 g/cm^{3}
Melting point	248 to 250 °C (478 to 482 °F; 521 to 523 K)

Hazards
- GHS labelling
Pictograms	(GHS07: Exclamation mark)
Signal word	Warning
Hazard statements	H315, H319, H335
Precautionary statements	P261, P264, P271, P280, P302+P352, P304+P340, P305+P351+P338, P312, P321, P332+P313, P337+P313, P362, P403+P233, P405, P501
- Except where otherwise noted, data are given for materials in their standard state (at 25 °C [77 °F], 100 kPa). verify (what is ?) Infobox references

9,10-Diphenylanthracene is a polycyclic aromatic hydrocarbon. It has the appearance of a slightly yellow powder. 9,10-Diphenylanthracene is used as a sensitiser in chemiluminescence. In glow sticks it is used to produce blue light. It is a molecular organic semiconductor, used in blue OLEDs and OLED-based displays.

== See also ==
- 2-Chloro-9,10-diphenylanthracene, a chlorinated derivative
