= 1,2-Dioxetanedione =

Names
- Preferred IUPAC name 1,2-Dioxetanedione
- Other names Peroxyacid ester

Identifiers
| CAS Number | 26974-08-3 |
| 3D model (JSmol) | Interactive image |
| ChemSpider | 11535432 |
| PubChem CID | 14833747 |
| CompTox Dashboard (EPA) | DTXSID80564519 |
- InChI: InChI=1S/C2O4/c3-1-2(4)6-5-1 Key: WYNZXNXFHYJUTE-UHFFFAOYSA-N; InChI=1/C2O4/c3-1-2(4)6-5-1 Key: WYNZXNXFHYJUTE-UHFFFAOYAI
- SMILES: O=C1OOC1=O

Properties
| Chemical formula | C_{2}O_{4} |
| Molar mass | 88.018 g·mol^{−1} |
- Except where otherwise noted, data are given for materials in their standard state (at 25 °C [77 °F], 100 kPa). verify (what is ?) Infobox references

The chemical compound 1,2-dioxetanedione, or 1,2-dioxacyclobutane-3,4-dione, often called peroxyacid ester, is an unstable oxide of carbon (an oxocarbon) with formula C_{2}O_{4}. It can be viewed as a double ketone of 1,2-dioxetane (1,2-dioxacyclobutane), or a cyclic dimer of carbon dioxide.

In ordinary conditions, it quickly decomposes to carbon dioxide (CO_{2}) even at 180 K (−93.1 °C), but can be detected by mass spectrometry and other techniques.

1,2-Dioxetanedione is an intermediate in the chemoluminescent reactions used in glowsticks. The decomposition proceeds via a paramagnetic oxalate biradical intermediate.

It is an intermediate in a reaction (between oxalyl chloride and hydrogen peroxide in ethyl acetate, accumulating in solution at room temperature up to a few micromoles, provided that the activating dye and all traces of metals and other reducing agents are removed from the system, and the reactions are carried out in an inert atmosphere.

== See also ==
- 1,3-dioxetanedione
