= List of UN numbers 2001 to 2100 =

UN numbers from UN2001 to UN2100 as assigned by the United Nations Committee of Experts on the Transport of Dangerous Goods are as follows:

== UN 2001 to UN 2100 ==
UN Number	Class	Proper Shipping Name
UN 2001	4.1	Cobalt naphthenates, powder
UN 2002	4.2	Celluloid, scrape
UN 2003	4.2	(UN No. no longer in use) Metal alkyls, water-reactive, n.o.s. or Metal aryls, water-reactive, n.o.s. (UN No. no longer in use)
UN 2004	4.2	Magnesium diamide
UN 2005	4.2	(UN No. no longer in use) Magnesium diphenyl (UN No. no longer in use)
UN 2006	4.2	Plastics, nitrocellulose-based, self-heating, n.o.s.
UN 2007	?	(UN No. no longer in use)
UN 2008	4.2	Zirconium powder, dry
UN 2009	4.2	Zirconium, dry, finished sheets, strip or coiled wire
UN 2010	4.3	Magnesium hydride
UN 2011	4.3	Magnesium phosphide
UN 2012	4.3	Potassium phosphide
UN 2013	4.3	Strontium phosphide
UN 2014	5.1	Hydrogen peroxide, aqueous solutions with more than 20 percent but not more than 60 percent hydrogen peroxide (stabilized as necessary)
UN 2015	5.1	Hydrogen peroxide, stabilized or Hydrogen peroxide aqueous solutions, stabilized with more than 60 percent hydrogen peroxide
UN 2016	6.1	Ammunition, toxic, non-explosive, without burster or expelling charge, non-fuzed
UN 2017	6.1	Ammunition, tear-producing, non-explosive, without burster or expelling charge, non-fuzed
UN 2018	6.1	Chloroanilines, solid
UN 2019	6.1	Chloroanilines, liquid
UN 2020	6.1	Chlorophenols, solid
UN 2021	6.1	Chlorophenols, liquid
UN 2022	6.1	Cresylic acid
UN 2023	6.1	Epichlorohydrin
UN 2024	6.1	Mercury compounds, liquid, n.o.s.
UN 2025	6.1	Mercury compounds, solid, n.o.s.
UN 2026	6.1	Phenylmercuric compounds, n.o.s.
UN 2027	6.1	Sodium arsenite, solid
UN 2028	8	Bombs, smoke, non-explosive, with corrosive liquid, without initiating device
UN 2029	8	Hydrazine, anhydrous
UN 2030	8	Hydrazine aqueous solution, with more than 37 percent hydrazine, by mass
UN 2031	8	Nitric acid other than red fuming, with more than 70 percent nitric acid or Nitric acid other than red fuming, with not more than 70 percent nitric acid
UN 2032	8	Nitric acid, red fuming
UN 2033	8	Potassium monoxide
UN 2034	2	Hydrogen and Methane mixtures, compressed
UN 2035	2	1,1,1-Trifluoroethane, compressed or Refrigerant gas R 143a
UN 2036	2	Xenon, compressed
UN 2037	2	Gas cartridges (flammable) without a release device, non-refillable or Receptacles, small, containing gas (gas cartridges) flammable or nonflammable, without release device, not refillable and not exceeding 1 L capacity
UN 2038	6.1	Dinitrotoluenes, liquid or Dinitrotoluenes, solid
UN 2039 to 2043	?	(UN No.s no longer in use)
UN 2044	2	2,2-Dimethylpropane
UN 2045	3	Isobutyraldehyde or Isobutyl aldehyde
UN 2046	3	Cymenes
UN 2047	3	Dichloropropenes
UN 2048	3	Dicyclopentadiene
UN 2049	3	Diethylbenzene
UN 2050	3	Diisobutylene, isomeric compounds
UN 2051	8	2-Dimethylaminoethanol
UN 2052	3	Dipentene
UN 2053	3	Methyl isobutyl carbinol
UN 2054	3	Morpholine
UN 2055	3	Styrene monomer, inhibited
UN 2056	3	Tetrahydrofuran
UN 2057	3	Tripropylene
UN 2058	3	Valeraldehyde
UN 2059	3	Nitrocellulose, solution, flammable with not less than 12.6 percent nitrogen, by mass, and not more than 55 percent nitrocellulose
UN 2060	?	(UN No. no longer in use) Box toe gum (UN No. no longer in use)
UN 2061 to 2066	?	(UN No.s no longer in use)
UN 2067	5.1	Ammonium nitrate fertilizers; uniform non-segregating mixtures of ammonium nitrate with added matter which is inorganic and chemically inert towards ammonium nitrate, with not less than 90 percent ammonium nitrate and not more than 0.2 percent combustible
UN 2068	?	(UN No. no longer in use) Ammonium nitrate-carbonate mixture (UN No. no longer in use)
UN 2069	?	(UN No. no longer in use) Ammonium nitrate mixed fertilizer (UN No. no longer in use)
UN 2070	?	(UN No. no longer in use) Ammonium nitrate-phosphate mixture (UN No. no longer in use)
UN 2071	9	Ammonium nitrate fertilizers: uniform non-segregating mixtures of nitrogen/phosphate or nitrogen/potash types or complete fertilizers of nitrogen/phosphate/potash type, with not more than 70 percent ammonium nitrate and not more than 0.4 percent total combustible/organic material calculated as carbon or with not more than 45 percent ammonium nitrate and unrestricted combustible material
UN 2072	?	(UN No. no longer in use) Ammonium nitrate fertilizers, n.o.s. (UN No. no longer in use)
UN 2073	2.2	Ammonia solution, relative density less than 0.880 at 15 °C in water, with more than 35 percent but not more than 50 percent ammonia
UN 2074	6.1	Acrylamide, Solid
UN 2075	6.1	Chloral, anhydrous, inhibited
UN 2076	6.1	Cresols
UN 2077	6.1	alpha-Naphthylamine
UN 2078	6.1	Toluene diisocyanate
UN 2079	8	Diethylenetriamine
UN 2080	?	(UN No. no longer in use) Acetyl acetone peroxide (UN No. no longer in use)
UN 2081	?	(UN No. no longer in use) Acetyl benzoyl peroxide or Acetyl benzoyl peroxide solution (UN No. no longer in use)
UN 2082	?	(UN No. no longer in use) Acetyl cyclohexane sulphonyl peroxide (UN No. no longer in use)
UN 2083	?	(UN no. no longer in use) Acetyl cyclohexane sulphonyl peroxide (UN No. no longer in use)
UN 2084	?	(UN No. no longer in use) Acetyl peroxide or Acetyl peroxide solution (UN No. no longer in use)
UN 2085	5.2	(UN No. no longer in use) Benzoyl peroxide (UN No. no longer in use)
UN 2086	5.2	(UN No. no longer in use) Benzoyl peroxide (UN No. no longer in use)
UN 2087	5.2	(UN No. no longer in use) Benzoyl peroxide (UN No. no longer in use)
UN 2088	5.2	(UN No. no longer in use) Benzoyl peroxide (UN No. no longer in use)
UN 2089	5.2	(UN No. no longer in use) Benzoyl peroxide (UN No. no longer in use)
UN 2090	5.2	(UN No. no longer in use) Benzoyl peroxide (UN No. no longer in use)
UN 2091	?	(UN No. no longer in use) tert-Butyl cumyl peroxide (UN No. no longer in use)
UN 2092	?	(UN No. no longer in use) tert-Butyl hydroperoxide (UN No. no longer in use)
UN 2093	?	(UN No. no longer in use) tert-Butyl hydroperoxide (UN No. no longer in use)
UN 2094	?	(UN No. no longer in use) tert-Butyl hydroperoxide (UN No. no longer in use)
UN 2095	?	(UN No. no longer in use) tert-Butyl peroxyacetate (UN No. no longer in use)
UN 2096	?	(UN No. no longer in use) tert-Butyl peroxyacetate (UN No. no longer in use)
UN 2097	?	(UN No. no longer in use) tert-Butyl peroxybenzoate (UN No. no longer in use)
UN 2098	?	(UN No. no longer in use) tert-Butyl peroxybenzoate (UN No. no longer in use)
UN 2099	?	(UN No. no longer in use) tert-Butyl peroxymaleate (UN No. no longer in use)
UN 2100	?	(UN No. no longer in use) tert-Butyl peroxymaleate (UN No. no longer in use)

== See also ==
- Lists of UN numbers
