= Organic peroxides =

Organic compounds of the form R–O–O–R′

The general structure of an organic peroxide

Organic peroxides are organic compounds containing the peroxide functional group (R−O−O−R′). If the R′ is hydrogen, the compounds are called organic hydroperoxides. The O−O bond of peroxides easily breaks, producing free radicals of the form RO^{•} (the dot represents an unpaired electron). Thus, organic peroxides are useful in organic chemistry as initiators for some types of polymerization, such as the acrylic, unsaturated polyester, and vinyl ester resins used in glass-reinforced plastics. MEKP and benzoyl peroxide are commonly used for this purpose. However, the same property also means that organic peroxides can explosively combust. Organic peroxides, like their inorganic counterparts, are often powerful bleaching agents.

== Types of organic peroxides ==
Organic peroxides are classified (i) by the presence or absence of a hydroxyl (−OH) terminus and (ii) by the presence of alkyl vs acyl substituents.

Examples of organic peroxides

tert-Butyl hydroperoxide, a hydroperoxide (formula: ROOH), which is used to epoxide alkenes.

Dicumyl peroxide, a dialkyl peroxide (formula: ROOR), which is used to initiate polymerizations.

tert-butylperoxybenzoate, a peroxy ester (formula: RCO_{3}R') that is used as a radical initiator.

dibenzoyl peroxide, a diacyl peroxide (formula: (RCO_{2})_{2})) is also used as an initiator for polymerizations.

Peroxyacetic acid, a peroxycarboxylic acid (formula: (RCO_{3}H), is a reagent in organic synthesis.

Prostaglandin G2, an endo peroxide, the precursor to other prostaglandins

Diphenyl peroxide has never been observed, and quantum chemical calculations predict that it does not exist, because it immediately undergoes a nearly barrierless reaction akin to the benzidine rearrangement.

== Properties ==
The O−O bond length in peroxides is about 1.45 Å, and the R−O−O angles (R = H, C) are about 110° (water-like). Characteristically, the C−O−O−R (R = H, C) dihedral angles are about 120°. The O−O bond is relatively weak, with a bond dissociation energy of 45–50 kcal/mol (190–210 kJ/mol), less than half the strengths of C−C, C−H, and C−O bonds.

== Biology ==
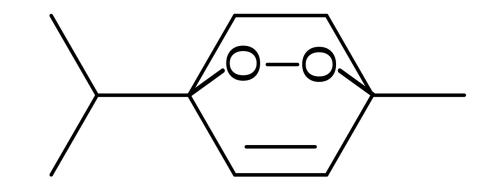
The peroxide ascaridole, derived from terpinene

Peroxides play important roles in biology. Hundreds of peroxides and hydroperoxides are known, being derived from fatty acids, steroids, and terpenes. The prostaglandins are biosynthesized by initial formation of a bicyclic peroxide ("endoperoxide") derived from arachidonic acid.

Many aspects of biodegradation or aging are attributed to the formation and decay of peroxides formed from oxygen in air. Countering these effects, an array of biological and artificial antioxidants destroy peroxides.

In fireflies, oxidation of luciferins, which is catalyzed by luciferases, yields a peroxy compound 1,2-dioxetane. The dioxetane is unstable and decays spontaneously to carbon dioxide and excited ketones, which release excess energy by emitting light (bioluminescence).

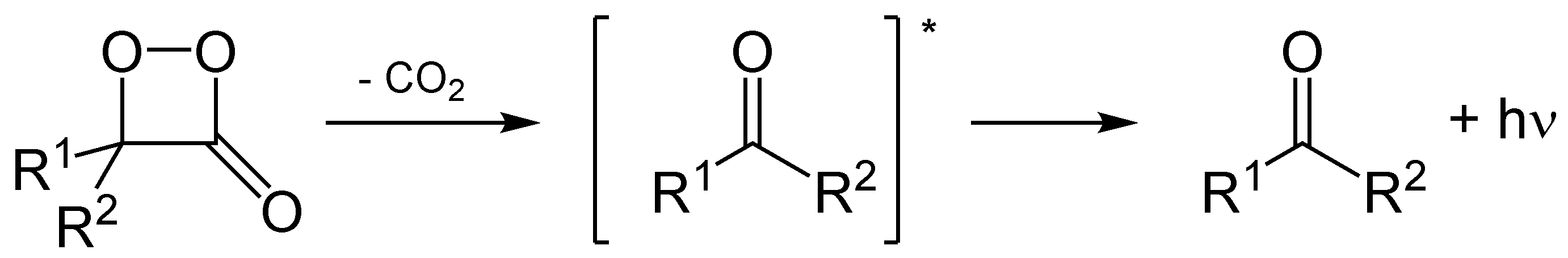
Loss of CO_{2} of a dioxetane, giving rise to an excited ketone, which relaxes by emitting light.

== Industrial uses ==
=== In polymer chemistry ===
Many peroxides are used as a radical initiators, e.g., to enable polymerization of acrylates. Industrial resins based on acrylic and/or methacrylic acid esters are invariably produced by radical polymerization with organic peroxides at elevated temperatures. The polymerization rate is adjusted by suitable choice of temperature and type of peroxide.

Methyl ethyl ketone peroxide, benzoyl peroxide and to a smaller degree acetone peroxide are used as initiators for radical polymerization of some thermosets, e.g. unsaturated polyester and vinyl ester resins, often encountered when making fiberglass or carbon fiber composites (CFRP). Examples include boats, RV units, bath tubs, pools, sporting equipment, wind turbine blades, and a variety of industrial applications.

Benzoyl peroxide, peroxyesters/peroxyketals, and alkylperoxy monocarbonates are used in production of polystyrene, expanded polystyrene, and High Impact Polystyrene, and benzoyl peroxide is utilized for many acrylate based adhesive applications.

Thermoplastic production techniques for many industrial polymerization applications include processes which are carried out in bulk, solution, or suspension type batches. Relevant polymers include: polyvinyl chloride (PVC), low-density polyethylene (LDPE), high-density polyethylene (HDPE), polymethyl methacrylate (PMMA), Polystyrene, and Polycarbonates.

=== Other uses ===
For flour, it is desirable to oxidize glutenin and gliadin, since it converts free thiol groups to disulfide bonds. Then, when flour is mixed with water, the glutenin and gliadin combine to form gluten. More disulfide bonds increases the strength of the gluten and also its other mechanical properties. The degree of oxidization controls the mechanical property of the gluten. Before industrialization, it was common to let the flour slowly oxidize by air. After industrialization, this is too slow, and benzoyl peroxide and hydrogen peroxide are used to treat flour as bleaching and "maturing" agents.

Bleaching flour also turns it white, which may be aesthetically pleasing. For example, cake flour is often bleached with chlorine to make it fully white.

Benzoyl peroxide is an effective topical medication for treating most forms of acne.

== Preparation ==
=== From hydrogen peroxide ===
Dialkyl peroxides, e.g., dicumyl peroxide, are synthesized by addition of hydrogen peroxide to alkenes or by O-alkylation of hydroperoxides.

Diacyl peroxides are typically prepared by treating hydrogen peroxide with acid chlorides or acid anhydrides in the presence of base:

H_{2}O_{2} + 2 RCOCl → (RCO_{2})_{2} + 2 HCl
H_{2}O_{2} + (RCO)_{2}O → (RCO_{2})_{2} + H_{2}O

The reaction competes with hydrolysis of the acylating agent but the hydroperoxide anion is a superior nucleophile relative to hydroxide. Unsymmetrical diacyl peroxides can be produced by treating acyl chlorides with the peroxy acid.

Peresters, an example being tert-Butyl peroxybenzoate, are produced by treating acid anhydrides or acid chlorides with hydroperoxides.

=== From O_{2} ===
Cyclic peroxides can be obtained by cycloaddition of singlet oxygen (generated by UV radiation) to dienes. An important example is rubrene. Six-membered cyclic peroxides are called endo peroxides. The four-membered dioxetanes can be obtained by 2+2 cycloaddition of oxygen to alkenes.

The hazards associated with storage of ethers in air is attributed to the formation of hydroperoxides via the direct albeit slow reaction of triplet oxygen with C-H bonds.

== Reactions ==
=== Homolysis ===
Organic peroxides are widely used to initiate polymerization of olefins, e.g. the formation of polyethylene. A key step is homolysis:

ROOR ⇌ 2 RO^{.}

The tendency to homolyze is also exploited to modify polymers by grafting or visbreaking, or cross-link polymers to create a thermoset. When used for these purposes, the peroxide is highly diluted, so the heat generated by the exothermic decomposition is safely absorbed by the surrounding medium (e.g. polymer compound or emulsion).

=== Self-oxidation ===
Especially when in concentrated form, organic peroxides can decompose by self-oxidation, since organic peroxides contain both an oxidizer (the O-O bond) and fuel (C-H and C-C bonds). A "self-accelerating decomposition" occurs when the rate of peroxide decomposition generates heat at a faster rate than it can be dissipated to the environment. Temperature is the main factor in the rate of decomposition. The lowest temperature at which a packaged organic peroxide will undergo a self-accelerating decomposition within a week is defined as the self-accelerating decomposition temperature (SADT). A large fire at the Arkema Chemical Plant in Crosby, Texas (USA) in 2017 was caused by the decomposition of various organic peroxides following power failure and subsequent loss of cooling systems. This occurred due to extreme flooding from Hurricane Harvey, which destroyed main and back-up power generators at the site.

=== Cumene process ===
Hydroperoxides are intermediates or reagents in major commercial processes. In the cumene process, acetone and phenol are produced by decomposition of cumene hydroperoxide (Me = methyl):

C_{6}H_{5}CMe_{2}(O_{2}H) → C_{6}H_{5}OH + O=CMe_{2}

=== Anthraquinone process ===
Anthrahydroquinone reacts spontaneously with oxygen to form anthraquinone and hydrogen peroxide, possibly through some organic peroxide intermediate. After extracting the hydrogen peroxide the anthraquinone is catalytically reduced to anthrahydroquinone and reused in the process. There are other hydroquinones reacting in a similar fashion.

=== Reduction ===
Organoperoxides can be reduced to alcohols with lithium aluminium hydride, as described in this idealized equation:

4 ROOH + LiAlH_{4} → LiAlO_{2} + 2 H_{2}O + 4 ROH

The phosphite esters and tertiary phosphines also effect reduction:

ROOH + PR_{3} → P(OR)_{3} + ROH

Cleavage to ketones and alcohols occurs in the base-catalyzed Kornblum–DeLaMare rearrangement, which involves the breaking of bonds within peroxides to form these products.

Some peroxides are drugs, whose action is based on the formation of radicals at desired locations in the organism. For example, artemisinin and its derivatives, such as artesunate, possess the most rapid action of all current drugs against falciparum malaria. Artesunate is also efficient in reducing egg production in Schistosoma haematobium infection.

=== Organic synthesis ===
tert-Butyl hydroperoxide is used for epoxidation and hydroxylation reagents in conjunction with metal catalysts.

== Analysis of peroxides ==
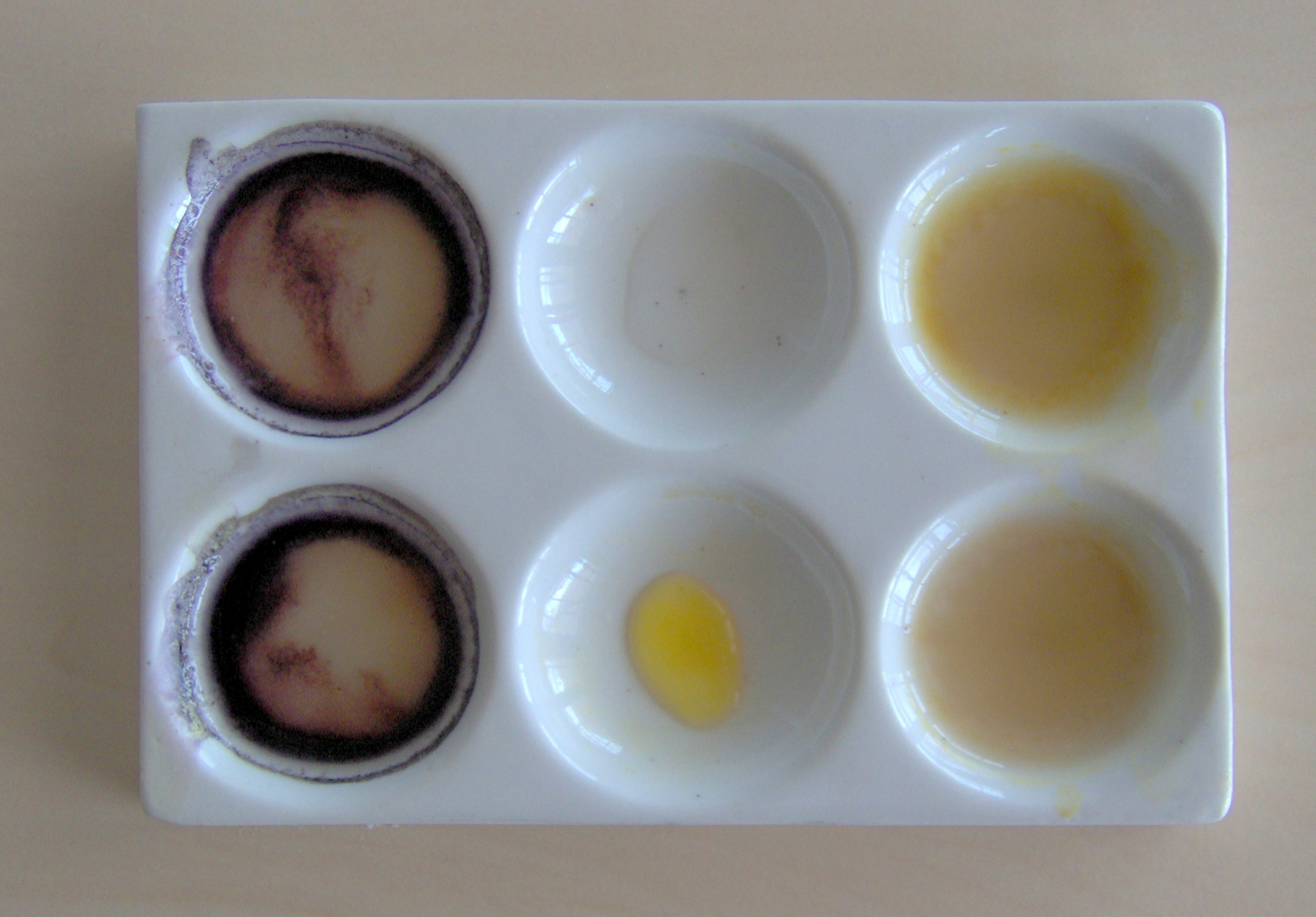
Iodine-starch test. Note the blackening (left) of initially yellowish (right) starch.

Several analytical methods are used for qualitative and quantitative determination of peroxides. A simple qualitative detection of peroxides is carried out with the iodine-starch reaction. Here peroxides, hydroperoxides or peracids oxidize the added potassium iodide into iodine, which reacts with starch producing a deep-blue color. Commercial paper indicators using this reaction are available. This method is also suitable for quantitative evaluation, but it can not distinguish between different types of peroxide compounds. Discoloration of various indigo dyes in presence of peroxides is used instead for this purpose. For example, the loss of blue color in leuco-methylene blue is selective for hydrogen peroxide.

Quantitative analysis of hydroperoxides can be performed using potentiometric titration with lithium aluminium hydride. Another way to evaluate the content of peracids and peroxides is the volumetric titration with alkoxides such as sodium ethoxide.

=== Active oxygen in peroxides ===
Each peroxy group is considered to contain one active oxygen atom. The concept of active oxygen content is useful for comparing the relative concentration of peroxy groups in formulations, which is related to the energy content. In general, energy content increases with active oxygen content, and thus the higher the molecular weight of the organic groups, the lower the energy content and, usually, the lower the hazard.

The term active oxygen is used to specify the amount of peroxide present in any organic peroxide formulation. One of the oxygen atoms in each peroxide group is considered "active". The theoretical amount of active oxygen can be described by the following equation:

$$A[\mathrm{O}]_\text{theoretical} (%) = 16\frac{p}{m} \times 100,$$

where p is the number of peroxide groups in the molecule, and m is the molecular mass of the pure peroxide.

Organic peroxides are often sold as formulations that include one or more phlegmatizing agents. That is, for safety sake or performance benefits the properties of an organic peroxide formulation are commonly modified by the use of additives to phlegmatize (desensitize), stabilize, or otherwise enhance the organic peroxide for commercial use. Commercial formulations occasionally consist of mixtures of organic peroxides, which may or may not be phlegmatized.

== Safety ==
The GHS transport pictogram for organic peroxides.

Peroxides are also strong oxidizers and easily react with skin, cotton and wood pulp. For safety reasons, peroxidic compounds are stored in a cool, opaque container, as heating and illumination accelerate their chemical reactions. Small amounts of peroxides, which emerge from storage or reaction vessels are neutralized using reducing agents such as iron(II) sulfate. Safety measures in industrial plants producing large amounts of peroxides include the following:

- The equipment is located within reinforced concrete structures with foil windows, which would relieve pressure and not shatter in case of explosion.
- The products are bottled in small containers and are moved to a cold place promptly after the synthesis.
- The containers are made of non-reactive materials such as stainless steel, some aluminium alloys or dark glass.

For safe handling of concentrated organic peroxides, an important parameter is temperature of the sample, which should be maintained below the self accelerating decomposition temperature of the compound.

The shipping of organic peroxides is restricted. The US Department of Transportation lists organic peroxide shipping restrictions and forbidden materials in 49 CFR 172.101 Hazardous Materials Table based on the concentration and physical state of the material:

Chemical name	CAS Number	Prohibitions
Acetyl acetone peroxide	37187-22-7	> 9% by mass active oxygen
Acetyl benzoyl peroxide	644-31-5	solid, or > 40% in solution
Ascaridole	512-85-6	(organic peroxide)
tert-Butyl hydroperoxide	75-91-2	> 90% in solution (aqueous)
Di-(1-naphthoyl)peroxide	29903-04-6	
Diacetyl peroxide	110-22-5	solid, or > 25% in solution
Ethyl hydroperoxide	3031-74-1	
Methyl ethyl ketone peroxide	1338-23-4	> 9% by mass active oxygen in solution
Methyl isobutyl ketone peroxide	37206-20-5	> 9% by mass active oxygen in solution

== See also ==
- Alkenyl peroxides
- Peroxyacyl nitrates
- Tetroxanes
- Trioxane
- 1,2,3-Trioxolanes
- 1,2,4-Trioxolanes
