= Tetrahydrofuran =

Cyclic chemical compound, (CH2)4O

Skeletal formula of tetrahydrofuran
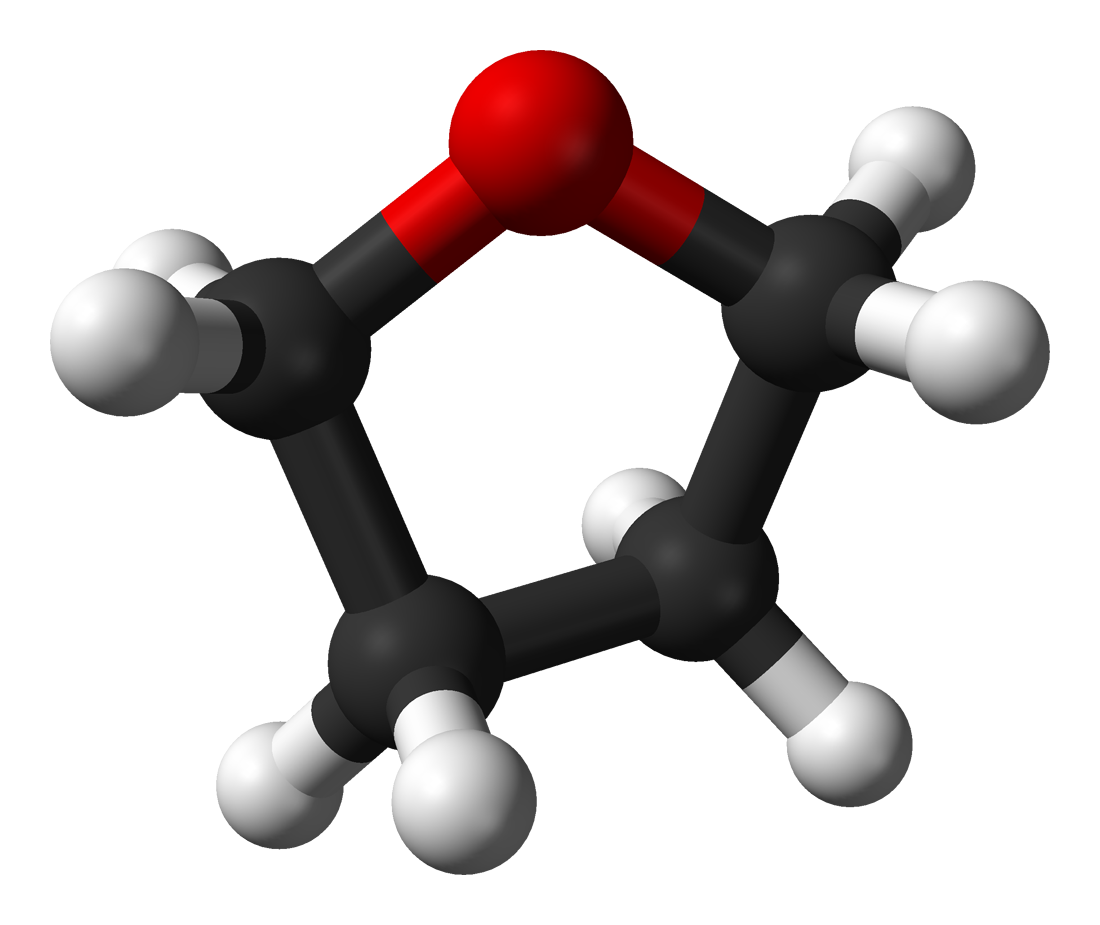
Ball-and-stick model of the tetrahydrofuran molecule
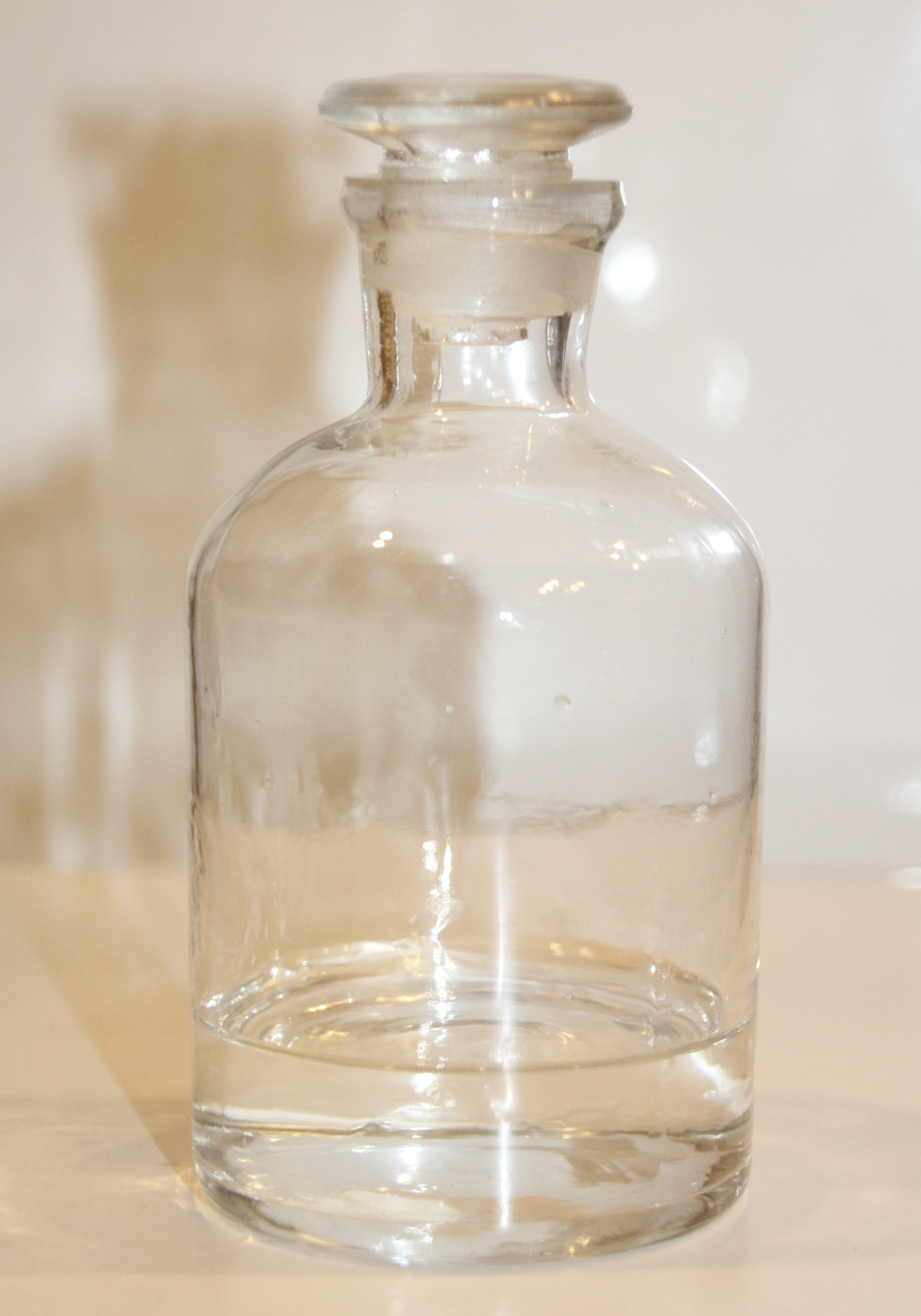
- Photograph of a glass bottle of tetrahydrofuran

Names
- Preferred IUPAC name Oxolane
- Systematic IUPAC name 1,4-Epoxybutane; 1-Oxacyclopentane
- Other names: Tetrahydrofuran; THF; 1,4-Butylene oxide; Cyclotetramethylene oxide fraction; Furanidin; Tetra-methylene oxide; Oxolane

Identifiers
CAS Number	109-99-9
3D model (JSmol)	Interactive image
Abbreviations	THF
ChEBI	CHEBI:26911
ChEMBL	ChEMBL276521
ChemSpider	7737
ECHA InfoCard	100.003.389
PubChem CID	8028
RTECS number	LU5950000
UNII	3N8FZZ6PY4
CompTox Dashboard (EPA)	DTXSID1021328
- InChI: InChI=1S/C4H8O/c1-2-4-5-3-1/h1-4H2 Key: WYURNTSHIVDZCO-UHFFFAOYSA-N; InChI=1/C4H8O/c1-2-4-5-3-1/h1-4H2 Key: WYURNTSHIVDZCO-UHFFFAOYAI
- SMILES: C1CCOC1

Properties
Chemical formula	C_{4}H_{8}O
Molar mass	72.107 g·mol^{−1}
Appearance	Colorless liquid
Odor	Ether-like
Density	0.8876 g/cm^{3} at 20 °C, liquid
Melting point	−108.4 °C (−163.1 °F; 164.8 K)
Boiling point	66 °C (151 °F; 339 K)
Solubility in water	Miscible
Vapor pressure	132 mmHg at 20 °C
Refractive index (n_{D})	1.4073 at 20 °C
Viscosity	0.48 cP at 25 °C

Structure
Molecular shape	Envelope
Dipole moment	1.63 D (gas)

Hazards
- GHS labelling
Pictograms	(GHS02: Flammable) (GHS07: Exclamation mark) (GHS08: Health hazard)
Signal word	Danger
Hazard statements	H225, H302, H319, H335, H351
Precautionary statements	P210, P280, P301+P312+P330, P305+P351+P338, P370+P378, P403+P235
NFPA 704 (fire diamond)	2 3 2
Flash point	−14 °C (7 °F; 259 K)
Autoignition temperature	215 °C (419 °F; 488 K)
Explosive limits	2–11.8%
- Lethal dose or concentration (LD, LC)
LD_{50} (median dose)	1650 mg/kg (rat, oral); 2300 mg/kg (mouse, oral); 2300 mg/kg (guinea pig, oral)
LC_{50} (median concentration)	21000 ppm (rat, 3 h)
- NIOSH (US health exposure limits)
PEL (Permissible)	TWA 200 ppm (590 mg/m^{3})
REL (Recommended)	TWA 200 ppm (590 mg/m^{3}) ST 250 ppm (735 mg/m^{3})
IDLH (Immediate danger)	2000 ppm

Related compounds
Related heterocycles	Furan; Pyrrolidine; Dioxane
Related compounds	Diethyl ether

Supplementary data page
- Tetrahydrofuran (data page)
- Except where otherwise noted, data are given for materials in their standard state (at 25 °C [77 °F], 100 kPa). verify (what is ?) Infobox references

Tetrahydrofuran (THF), or oxolane, is an organic compound with the formula (CH_{2})_{4}O. The compound is classified as heterocyclic compound, specifically a cyclic ether. It is a colorless, water-miscible organic liquid with low viscosity. It is mainly used as a precursor to polymers. Being polar and having a wide liquid range, THF is a versatile solvent. It is an isomer of another solvent, butanone.

== Production ==
About 200,000 tonnes of tetrahydrofuran are produced annually. The most widely used industrial process involves the acid-catalyzed dehydration of 1,4-butanediol. Ashland/ISP is one of the biggest producers of this chemical route. The method is similar to the production of diethyl ether from ethanol. The butanediol is derived from condensation of acetylene with formaldehyde followed by hydrogenation. DuPont developed a process, for producing THF by oxidizing n-butane to crude maleic anhydride, followed by catalytic hydrogenation. A third major industrial route entails hydroformylation of allyl alcohol followed by hydrogenation to 1,4-butanediol.

=== Other methods ===
THF can also be synthesized by catalytic hydrogenation of furan. This allows certain sugars to be converted to THF via acid-catalyzed digestion to furfural and decarbonylation to furan, although this method is not widely practiced. THF is thus derivable from renewable resources.

== Applications ==
=== Polymerization ===
In the presence of strong acids, THF converts to a linear polymer called poly(tetramethylene ether) glycol (PTMEG), also known as polytetramethylene oxide (PTMO):

$$n \, \ce{C4H8O} \quad \xrightarrow[{\text{strong} \atop \text{acid}}]{} \quad \bigl[\!\!\! \ce{-CH2CH2CH2CH2O -} \!\!\! \bigr]_n$$

This polymer is primarily used to make elastomeric polyurethane fibers like spandex.

=== As a solvent ===
The other main application of THF is as an industrial solvent for polyvinyl chloride (PVC) and in varnishes. It is an aprotic solvent with a dielectric constant of 7.6. It is a moderately polar solvent and can dissolve a wide range of nonpolar and polar chemical compounds. THF is water-miscible and can form solid clathrate hydrate structures with water at low temperatures.

THF has been explored as a miscible co-solvent in aqueous solution to aid in the liquefaction and delignification of plant lignocellulosic biomass for production of renewable platform chemicals and sugars as potential precursors to biofuels. Aqueous THF augments the hydrolysis of glycans from biomass and dissolves the majority of biomass lignin making it a suitable solvent for biomass pretreatment.

THF is often used in polymer science. For example, it can be used to dissolve polymers prior to determining their molecular mass using gel permeation chromatography. THF dissolves PVC as well, and thus it is the main ingredient in PVC adhesives. It can be used to liquefy old PVC cement and is often used industrially to degrease metal parts.

THF is used as a component in mobile phases for reversed-phase liquid chromatography. It has a greater elution strength than methanol or acetonitrile, but is less commonly used than these solvents.

THF is used as a solvent in 3D printing when printing with PLA, PETG and substantially similar filaments. It can be used to clean clogged 3D printer parts, to remove extruder lines and add a shine to the finished product as well as to solvent weld printed parts.

==== Laboratory use ====
In the laboratory, THF is a popular solvent when its water miscibility is not an issue. It is more basic than diethyl ether and forms stronger complexes with Li^{+}, Mg^{2+}, and boranes. It is a popular solvent for hydroboration reactions and for organometallic compounds such as organolithium and Grignard reagents. Thus, while diethyl ether remains the solvent of choice for some reactions (e.g., Grignard reactions), THF fills that role in many others, where strong coordination is desirable and the precise properties of ethereal solvents such as these (alone and in mixtures and at various temperatures) allows fine-tuning modern chemical reactions.

Commercial THF contains substantial water that must be removed for sensitive operations, e.g. those involving organometallic compounds. Although THF is traditionally dried by distillation from an aggressive desiccant such as elemental sodium, molecular sieves have been shown to be superior water scavengers.

==== Reaction with hydrogen sulfide ====
In the presence of a solid acid catalyst, THF reacts with hydrogen sulfide to give tetrahydrothiophene.

== Lewis basicity ==
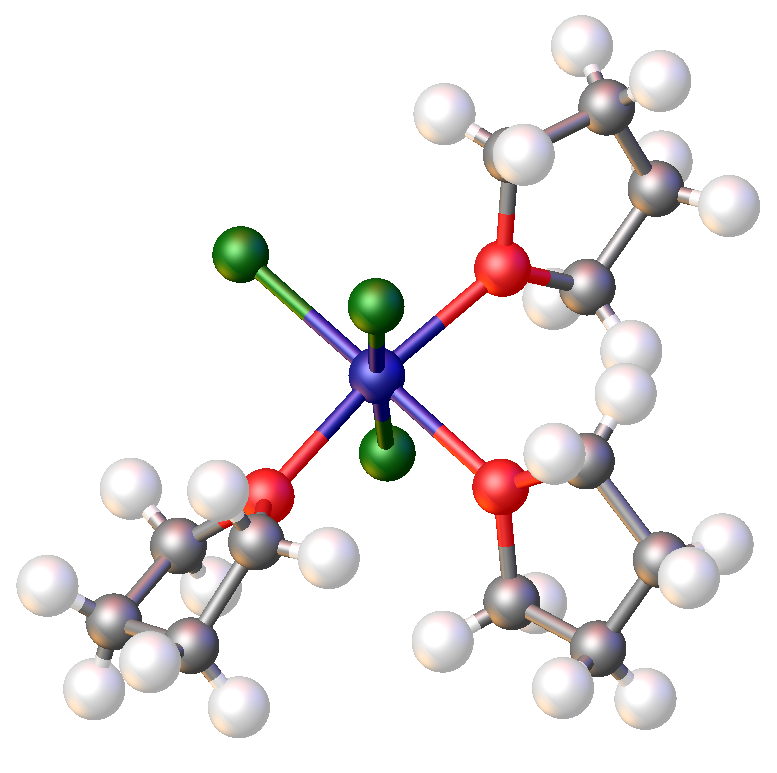
Structure of VCl_{3}(thf)_{3}.

THF is a Lewis base that bonds to a variety of Lewis acids such as I_{2}, phenols, triethylaluminum and bis(hexafluoroacetylacetonato)copper(II). THF has been classified in the ECW model and it has been shown that there is no one order of base strengths. Many complexes are of the stoichiometry MCl_{3}(THF)_{3}.

== Precautions ==
THF is a relatively acutely nontoxic solvent, with the median lethal dose (LD_{50}) comparable to that for acetone. However, chronic exposure is suspected of causing cancer. Reflecting its remarkable solvent properties, it penetrates the skin, causing rapid dehydration. It is highly flammable. THF dissolves or penetrates most polymer glove materials in a very short period of time; only Linear low-density polyethylene (LLDPE) laminated gloves are capable of protecting against it for long time periods, similar to most ketones. Polyvinyl alcohol (PVA) coated gloves are capable of providing protection for nearly an hour, but because PVA is water soluble they are only effective in low humidity environments and when working with anhydrous solvents. Even very thick nitrile or nitrile-neoprene gloves degrade in under 10 minutes.

One danger posed by THF is its tendency to form explosive peroxides upon reaction with air:

To minimize this problem, commercial supplies of THF are often stabilized with butylated hydroxytoluene (BHT). Distillation of THF to dryness is unsafe because the explosive peroxides can concentrate in the residue.

== Related compounds ==
=== Tetrahydrofurans ===
Chemical structure of annonacin, an acetogenin.

Eribulin (brand name: Halaven), a commercial THF-containing anticancer drug.

The tetrahydrofuran ring is found in diverse natural products including lignans, acetogenins, and polyketide natural products. Diverse methodology has been developed for the synthesis of substituted THFs.

=== Oxolanes ===
Tetrahydrofuran is one of the class of five-membered saturated carbon/oxygen rings called oxolanes. There are seven possible structures, namely,

- C_{4}O: Monoxolane, the root of the group, synonymous with tetrahydrofuran
- C_{3}O_{2}: 1,2-dioxolane and 1,3-dioxolane
- C_{2}O_{3}: 1,2,3-trioxolane and 1,2,4-trioxolane
- CO_{4}: tetroxolane

== See also ==
- Polytetrahydrofuran
- 2-Methyltetrahydrofuran
- Trapp mixture
- Other cyclic ethers: oxirane (C_{2}H_{4}O), oxetane (C_{3}H_{6}O), oxane (C_{5}H_{10}O), oxepane (C_{6}H_{12}O)

== General reference ==
- Loudon, G. Mark (2002). Organic Chemistry (4th ed.). New York: Oxford University Press. p. 318. ISBN 978-0-9815194-3-2.
