= Criegee rearrangement =

Rearrangement reaction in organic chemistry

The Criegee rearrangement is a rearrangement reaction named after Rudolf Criegee.

== Description ==
In this organic reaction, a tertiary alcohol is cleaved in an organic oxidation by a peroxyacid to a ketone. The acid used is often p-nitroperoxybenzoic acid because the p-nitrobenzoic acid anion is a good leaving group.

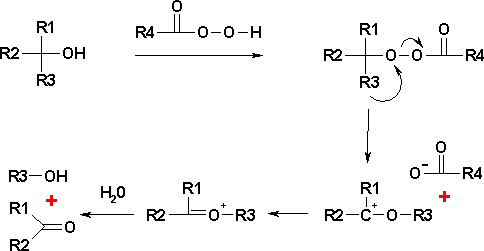

The reaction mechanism has similarities with the Baeyer-Villiger oxidation where the intermediate hydroxyperacid is called a Criegee intermediate. The per-acid forms a per-ester with the alcohol group. One alkyl substituent migrates from carbon to the adjacent oxygen atom, replacing the carboxylic acid leaving behind a carbocation. A hydrolysis step forms the ketone together with the alcohol. The order of migrationary aptitude is a tert-butyl as the best substituent followed by isopropyl then ethyl and then the methyl group. From this it is inferred that the migrating group carries a partial positive charge in the transition state leading to the carbocation. The consecutive Criegee Rearrangement is carried out in an acidic environment and an ester forms from the carbocation. This opens the way to multiple O-insertion reactions, eventually leading to the orthoester.
