= Griesbaum coozonolysis =

Chemical reaction

| Named after | Karl Griesbaum |
| Reaction type | Organic redox reaction |

Identifiers
| Organic Chemistry Portal | griesbaum-coozonolysis |

The Griesbaum coozonolysis is a name reaction in organic chemistry that allows for the preparation of tetrasubstituted ozonides (1,2,4-trioxolanes) by the reaction of O-methyl oximes with a carbonyl compound in the presence of ozone. Contrary to their usual roles as intermediates in ozonolysis and other oxidative alkene cleavage reactions, 1,2,4-trioxolanes are relatively stable compounds and are isolable.

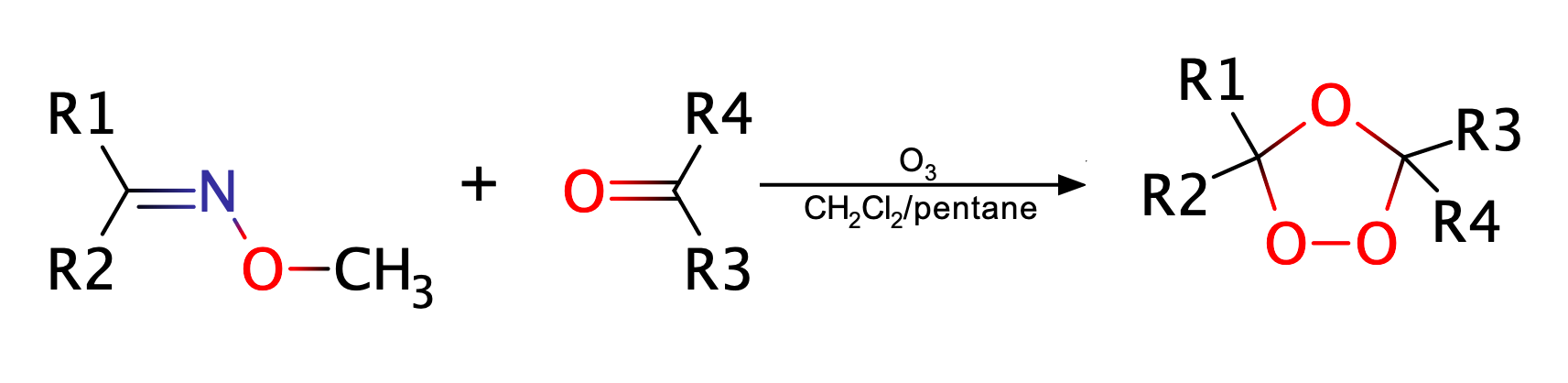
Griesbaum coozonolysis

== Mechanism ==
The oxime first reacts with the ozone to form the corresponding carbonyl oxide, undergoes 1,3-dipolar cycloaddition with the carbonyl reactant to form the cyclic ozonide, as usual for the Criegee intermediate in the ozonolysis of alkenes.

If no carbonyl compound is used, the carbonyl oxide may dimerize and form 1,2,4,5-tetroxanes.
