= Rudolf Criegee =

German chemist (1902–1975)

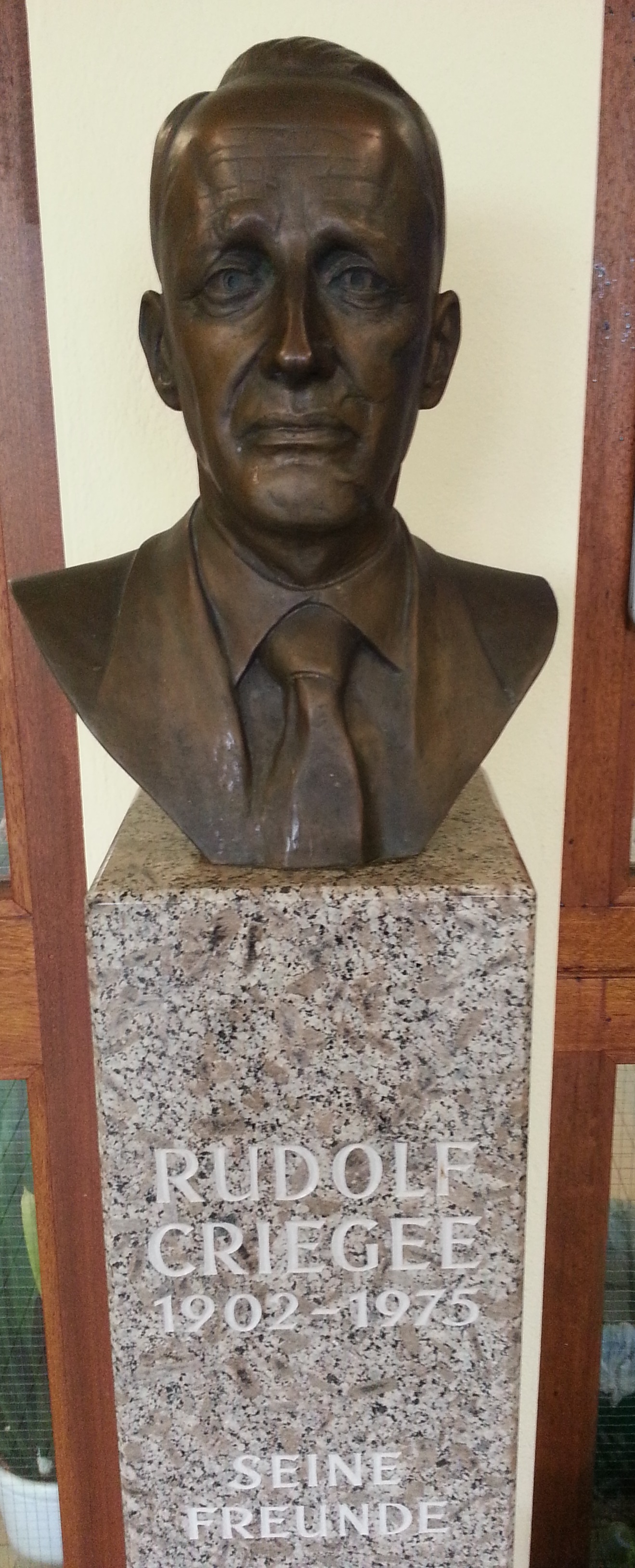
- Born: 23 May 1902; Düsseldorf, German Empire
- Died: 7 November 1975 (aged 73); Karlsruhe, West Germany
- Education: University of Tübingen; University of Marburg
- Occupation: Organic chemist

Rudolf Criegee (23 May 1902 — 7 November 1975) was a German organic chemist.

== Early life ==
Criegee was born on 23 May 1902 in Düsseldorf to a wealthy family. His father worked as a court director. The family was national liberal, Prussian and Protestant, managing what Rudolf Criegee felt was a great fortune. His happy childhood was ended by the World War I. In March 1915, his eldest brother died on the Western Front, while a second brother was seriously injured in the summer of 1916. Criegee himself was drafted.

After the post-war period, he matriculated at the University of Tübingen in chemistry in 1920. After four semesters of study and moderate success, his experience in student fraternity Germania and twelve duels, Criegee changed to the University of Greifswald. He remained there for three semesters and passed his first examination. He moved to the University of Würzburg and received his PhD in December 1925 at Otto Dimroth with a thesis on acridinium salts. His father died in 1926 and his mother suffered from a serious illness, before she died in 1932. Criegee remained in Würzburg and in 1930 he received his habilitation with a thesis on the "Oxydation ungesättigter Kohlenwasserstoffe mit Blei(IV)-Salzen“.

In 1928, Rudolf Criegee married his former fellow student Marianne Henze.

== Career ==
In 1932, he moved to the University of Marburg, where he worked as a senior assistant to Hans Meerwein. In November 1933, he was one of the signatories to the Vow of allegiance of the Professors of the German Universities and High-Schools to Adolf Hitler and the National Socialistic State. In 1937 he received an associate professorship at the Technical University of Karlsruhe, but his work was interrupted by World War II. He was drafted again.

In the summer of 1942, he was seriously wounded on the Eastern Front. His wife died on 10 February. Criegee was released to conduct research, but his institute was destroyed by bombs in the summer of 1944. In December he remarried.

After the war, he declined calls from other universities and was appointed a full professor in 1947. From 1949 he led the Institute of Organic Chemistry. His leadership led to a new building for the institute in 1966. He retired in 1969, although he continued research until his death on 7 November 1975.

In his scientific work he was primarily involved with oxidation processes of organic compounds, where he used Lead(IV) acetate and Osmium tetroxide as oxidizing agents . A focus was the investigation on the autoxidation of unsaturated cyclic hydrocarbons to peroxides.

One of his great achievements was the elucidation of the reaction mechanism for ozonolysis to form ozonides (1,2,4-trioxolanes). The Criegee intermediate (or Criegee biradical) and the Criegee rearrangement are named after him. In this context, his research on cyclic reactions and cyclic rearrangement mechanisms led him, independently of the Nobel Prize–winning work of R.B.Woodward and R.Hoffmann (Woodward–Hoffmann rules), to the same conclusions as theirs, but he failed to publish his findings in time. In his last years, he investigated the chemistry of small carbon rings, especially Cyclobutadiene and its Derivatives.

== Awards/Honorary degrees ==
- Emil Fischer Medal from the Society of German Chemists in 1960
- University of Giessen in 1967
- LMU Munich in 1972

== Memberships ==
- Bavarian Academy of Sciences and Humanities in 1962
- Heidelberg Academy for Sciences and Humanities in 1955
- German Academy of Sciences Leopoldina in 1968
- Honorable member of the New York Academy of Sciences in 1966

== Writings ==
- Die Einwirkung von Acridiniumsalzen auf kupplungsfähige Substanzen, Dissertation, Univ. Würzburg 1925
- Oxydation ungesättigter Kohlenwasserstoffe mit Blei(4)salzen, Liebigs Ann. Chem. 481,263 (1930) doi:10.1002/jlac.19304810117
- Die Umlagerung der Dekalin-peroxydester als Folge von kationischem Sauerstoff, Liebigs Ann. Chem. 560,127 (1948) doi:10.1002/jlac.19485600106
- R. C. und G. Schröder: Ein kristallisiertes Primärozonid, Chem. Ber. 93,689 (1960) doi:10.1002/cber.19600930323
- Mechanismus der Ozonolyse, Angew. Chem. 87,765 (1975) doi:10.1002/ange.19750872104; Angew. Chem., Int. Ed. Engl. 14,745 (1975) doi:10.1002/anie.197507451

== Sources ==
- Rolf Huisgen: Das Porträt: Rudolf Criegee (1902-1975), Chemie in unserer Zeit, 12. Jahrg. 1978, S. 49–55, ISSN 0009-2851
- Maier, G.: Rudolf Criegee. 1902–1975. (1977) Chem. Ber., 110: XXVII–XLVI. doi:10.1002/cber.19771100345
