= SADT (disambiguation) =

SADT or Structured Analysis and Design Technique is a software engineering methodology for describing systems as a hierarchy of functions.

SADT may also refer to:

- Self accelerating decomposition temperature, a physical property of organic peroxides
- Sports Association for the Disabled of Thailand, the national governing body for disabled sports in Thailand
