= K3P =

K3P may refer to:

- K_{3}P the chemical formula for Potassium phosphide
- Corridor K3P, a bus route in Palembang
- Kimura three parameter model, see Genetic distance#Kimura 3 Parameter distance
