= C3H6O2 =

The molecular formula C_{3}H_{6}O_{2} may refer to:

== Acids and esters ==
=== Acid ===
- Propanoic acid

=== Esters ===
- Methyl acetate
- Ethyl formate

== Aldehydes and ketones ==
- Lactaldehyde (2-hydroxypropanal)
  - (S)-Lactaldehyde
  - (R)-Lactaldehyde
- Reuterin (3-hydroxypropanal)
- Methoxyacetaldehyde
- Hydroxyacetone

== Alkenes ==
=== Diols ===
- 1-Propene-1,1-diol
- 1-Propene-1,2-diol
  - (E)-1-Propene-1,2-diol
  - (Z)-1-Propene-1,2-diol
- 1-Propene-1,3-diol
  - (E)-Propene-1,3-diol
  - (Z)-Propene-1,3-diol
- 2-Propene-1,1-diol
- 2-Propene-1,2-diol

=== Oxyethenol ===
- 1-Methoxyethenol

== Cyclic ==
=== Three atoms in ring ===
==== No oxygen in ring ====
- 1,1-Cyclopropandiol
- Cyclopropan-1,2-diol
  - (E)-Cyclopropan-1,2-diol
  - (Z)-Cyclopropan-1,2-diol

==== One oxygen in ring ====
- Glycidol (oxiran-2-ylmethanol)
  - (R)-Glycidol
  - (S)-Glycidol
- 2-Methyloxiranol
  - (R)-2-Methyloxiranol
  - (S)-2-Methyloxiranol
- 3-Methyloxiranol
  - (R,R)-3-Methyloxiranol
  - (R,S)-3-Methyloxiranol
  - (S,R)-3-Methyloxiranol
  - (S,S)-3-Methyloxiranol

==== Two oxygens in ring ====
- Dimethyldioxirane

=== Four atoms in ring ===
==== One oxygen in ring ====
- Oxetan-3-ol
- Oxetan-2-ol
  - (R)-Oxetan-2-ol
  - (S)-Oxetan-2-ol

==== Two oxygens in ring ====
- 3-Methyl-1,2-dioxetane
  - (R)-3-Methyl-1,2-dioxetane
  - (S)-3-Methyl-1,2-dioxetane
- 2-Methyl-1,3-dioxetane

=== Five atoms in ring ===
- 1,2-Dioxolane
- 1,3-Dioxolane
