= Cyclohexanone monooxygenase =

Class of enzymes

Identifiers
- EC no.: 1.14.13.22
- CAS no.: 52037-90-8

Databases
- IntEnz: IntEnz view
- BRENDA: BRENDA entry
- ExPASy: NiceZyme view
- KEGG: KEGG entry
- MetaCyc: metabolic pathway
- PRIAM: profile
- PDB structures: RCSB PDB PDBe PDBsum
Search
- PMC: articles
- PubMed: articles
- NCBI: proteins

Cyclohexanone monooxygenase (EC 1.14.13.22, cyclohexanone 1,2-monooxygenase, cyclohexanone oxygenase, cyclohexanone:NADPH:oxygen oxidoreductase (6-hydroxylating, 1,2-lactonizing)) is an enzyme with systematic name cyclohexanone,NADPH:oxygen oxidoreductase (lactone-forming). This enzyme catalyses the following chemical reaction

cyclohexanone
+ NADPH + H^{+}
O_{2}
H_{2}O
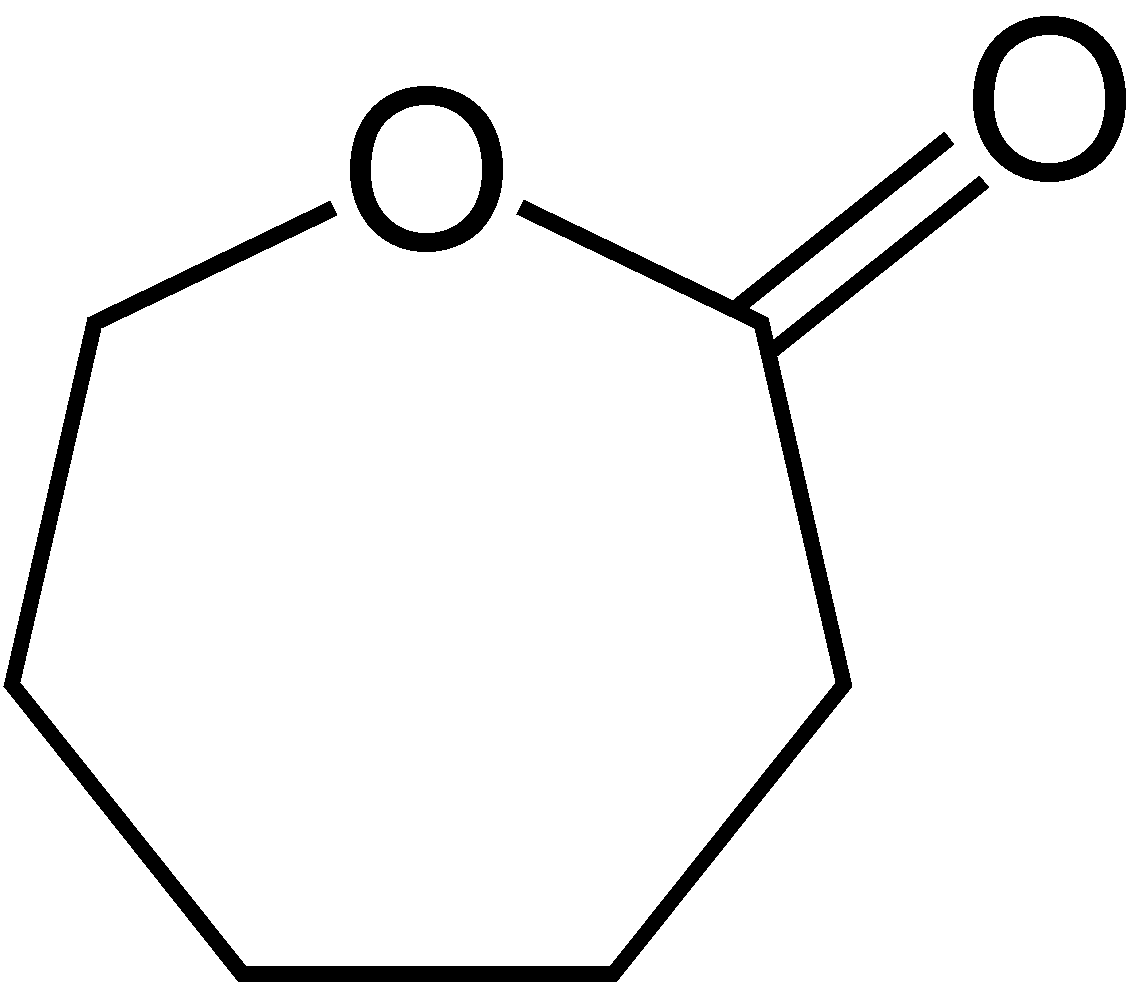
caprolactone
+ NADP^{+}

This enzyme contains 540 residues organized into a single subunit. Cyclohexanone monooxygenase is one of the most prominent Baeyer-Villiger monooxygenases (BVMOs) and has a low substrate specificity, allowing it to catalyze a number of reactions; given the variety of substrates, cyclohexanone monooxygenase is a useful enzyme for industrial applications.

== Enzyme mechanism ==
Cyclohexanone monooxygenase (CHMO) uses nicotinamide adenine dinucleotide phosphate (NADPH) and molecular oxygen as cosubstrates and flavin adenine dinucleotide as a cofactor to insert an oxygen atom into the substrate. The process involves the formation of a flavin-peroxide and Criegee intermediate.

CHMO is a member of the Baeyer-Villiger monooxygenase (BVMO) family and flavin-containing monooxygenases (FMO) superfamily.

Cyclohexanone undergoes the following process, similar to the Baeyer-Villiger reactions, to be converted into hexano-6-lactone using CHMO.

1. NADPH attaches to the active site of CHMO and transfers a hydride resulting in FADH- and NADP+.
2. A one-electron transfer from FADH- to O_{2} results in a superoxide radical and FAD semiquinone.
3. Recombination of the radical pair results in the C4a-peroxyflavin intermediate.
4. The C4a-peroxyflavin intermediate functions as a nucleophile and attacks the cyclohexanone substrate to form the Criegee intermediate.
5. The intermediate undergoes a rearrangement to produce the hexano-6-lactone.
6. CHMO releases H_{2}O and NADP+ and regenerates FADH.

CHMO can also oxygenate cyclic ketones, aromatic aldehydes, and heteroatom-containing compounds.

== Enzyme structure ==
Using CHMO isolated from Rhodococcus sp. Strain HI-31 and complexed with FAD and NADP+, two crystal structures were obtained showing CHMO in the open and closed conformations. Structurally, CHMO is stable and contains 540 residues organized into a single subunit.

CHMO contains binding domains for NADP+ and FAD, which are connected by two unstructured loops. The NADP binding domain consists of the segments 152-208 and 335-380 with a helical domain constructed between residues 224-332. The helical domain shifts between the two dinucleotide (NADP+ and FAD) binding domains and helps form the substrate binding pocket. The FAD binding domain consists of the first 140 N-terminal residues as well as residues 387-540 from the C-terminus.

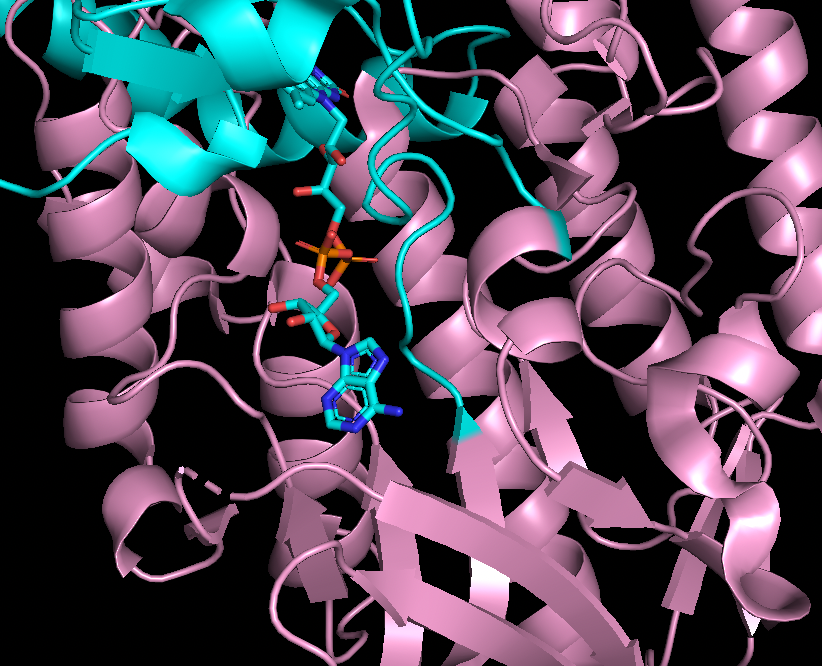
FAD bound to CHMO in the closed conformation (PDB ID: 3GWD).

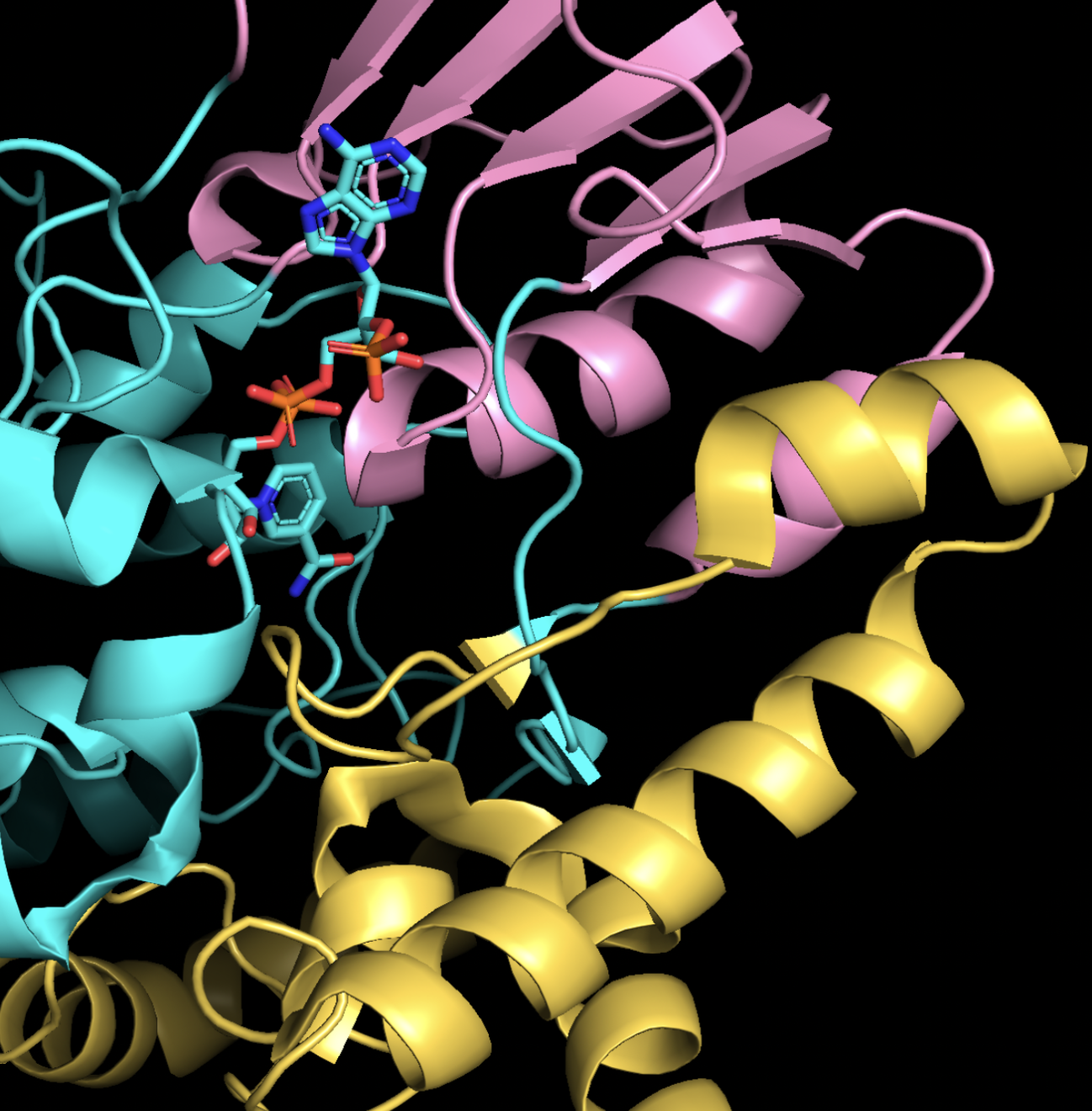
NADP+ bound to CHMO in the closed conformation (PDB ID: 3GWD). The NADP+ binding domain (residues 152-208 and 335 - 380) is shown in pink and the helical domain (residues 224-332) in yellow.

The substrate binding pocket is well defined in the closed conformation and consists of the residues 145−146, 248, 279, 329, 434−435, 437, 492, and 507; FAD and NADP+ also contribute to the shape of the binding pocket.

The key distinction between the open form, CHMO_{open}, and the closed form, CHMO_{closed}, lies in the conformation of residues 487-504, which form a loop. In the closed confirmation, the loop folds upon itself, internalizing the center portion of the loop. However, in the open conformation, the loop is not visible. It is predicted that this results from the loop adopting a solvent-exposed conformation.

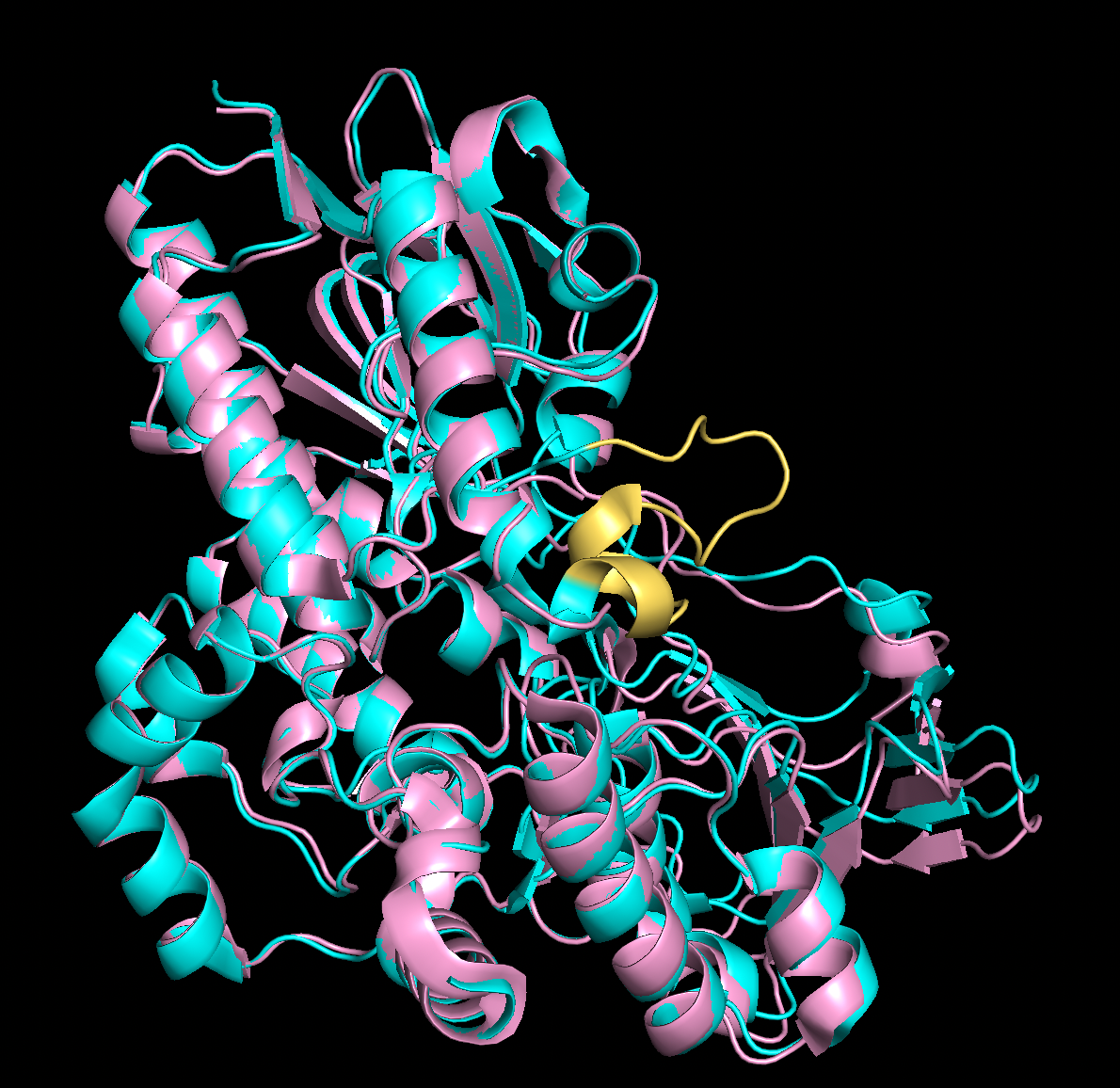
Comparison of the open and closed CHMO structures. The closed conformation of CHMO (PDB ID: 3GWD) is shown in teal and the open conformation of CHMO (PDB ID: 3GWF) is shown in pink. CHMO_{closed} clearly demonstrates the loop from residues 487-504 (marked in yellow), which is not visible in CHMO_{open.}

== Biological function ==
CHMO is a bacterial flavoenzyme whose main function in the cell is to catalyze the conversion of cyclohexanone, a cyclic ketone, into ε-caprolactone, a key step in the pathway for the biodedgredation of cyclohexanol. However, given the lack of specificity for CHMO, it can be used generally to form lactones from a number of four to six-membered cyclic ketones, which can then be hydrolyzed into aliphatic acids. Moreover, CHMO has the ability to oxygenate aromatic aldehydes and heteroatom-containing compounds – such as trivalent phosphorus and boronic acids– as well, making it a candidate for industrial use.

== Industrial relevance ==
Utilizing its affinity for multiple substrates and given that the mechanism is one of the most well studied Baeyer-Villiger monooxygenases (BVMOs) with high regio-, chemo- and enantioselectivity, CHMO has been identified as a useful industrial molecule. Strain-specific primers derived from the CMHO gene have already been used to developed and optimized to both quantify and monitor levels of Lysobacter antibioticus, a potential biological disease control for crops, in agricultural soils by PCR and real-time qPCR. With regard to the healthcare industry, CHMO mutants are a candidate for the efficient extraceullular enzymatic synthesis of (S)-omeprazole– a drug for gastroesophageal refux– when expressed by Pichia pastoris, a methylotrophic yeast. Additionally, CHMO has demonstrated its ability to form chiral synthons making CHMO a potential target for more cost-effective drug synthesis, specifically with regard to enantioselective lactones.
