= C2H4O3 =

C_{2}H_{4}O_{3} may refer to:

Compounds sharing the molecular formula:

- Glycolic acid (also known as hydroacetic acid or hydroxyacetic acid)
- Peracetic acid (also known as peroxyacetic acid)
- 1,2,3-Trioxolane
- 1,2,4-Trioxolane
- Monomethyl carbonate
