= Acetone peroxide =

- Cyclic dimer and trimer examples

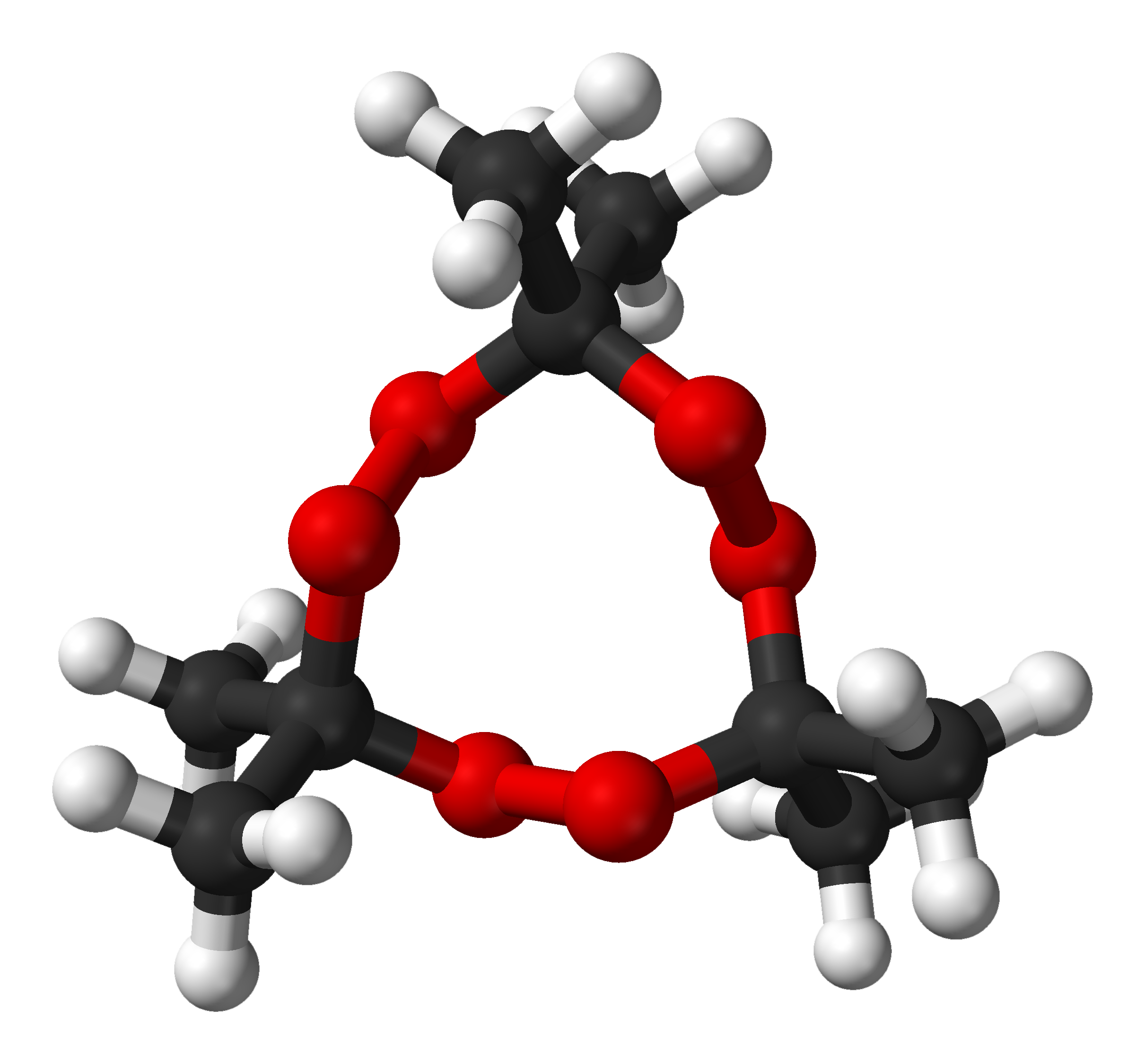
Acetone peroxide trimer
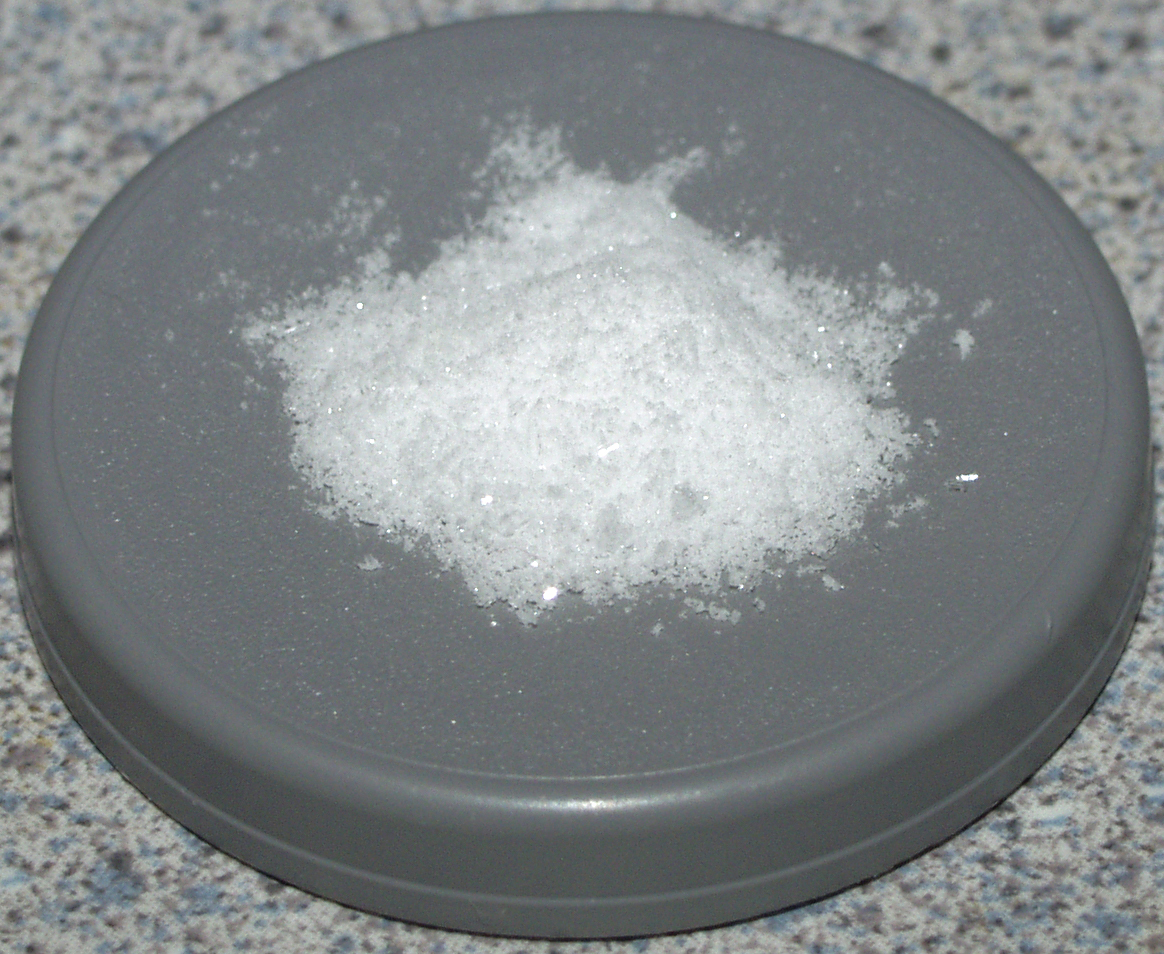

Names
- IUPAC names 3,3-Dimethyl-1,2-dioxacyclopropane (monomer); 3,3,6,6-Tetramethyl-1,2,4,5-tetraoxane (dimer); 3,3,6,6,9,9-Hexamethyl-1,2,4,5,7,8-hexaoxacyclononane (trimer); 3,3,6,6,9,9,12,12-Octamethyl-1,2,4,5,7,8,10,11-octaoxacyclododecane (tetramer)
- Other names Triacetone triperoxide Peroxyacetone; Mother of Satan

Identifiers
CAS Number	1336-17-0
3D model (JSmol)	dimer: Interactive image; trimer: Interactive image
ChemSpider	3582942
E number	E929 (glazing agents, ...)
PubChem CID	4380970
UNII	62T938ZGDD
CompTox Dashboard (EPA)	DTXSID80158194
- InChI: InChI=1S/C9H18O6/c1-7(2)10-12-8(3,4)14-15-9(5,6)13-11-7/h1-6H3 Key: ZTLXICJMNFREPA-UHFFFAOYSA-N; InChI=1/C9H18O6/c1-7(2)10-12-8(3,4)14-15-9(5,6)13-11-7/h1-6H3 Key: ZTLXICJMNFREPA-UHFFFAOYAS
- SMILES: dimer: CC1(C)OOC(C)(C)OO1; trimer: CC1(C)OOC(C)(C)OOC(C)(C)OO1

Properties
Chemical formula	C_{6}H_{12}O_{4} (dimer); C_{9}H_{18}O_{6} (trimer); C_{12}H_{24}O_{8} (tetramer)
Molar mass	148.157 g/mol (dimer); 222.24 g/mol (trimer); 296.296 g/mol (tetramer)
Appearance	White crystalline solid
Melting point	131.5 to 133 °C (dimer); 91 °C (trimer)
Boiling point	97 to 160 °C (207 to 320 °F; 370 to 433 K)
Solubility in water	Insoluble

Hazards
- GHS labelling
Pictograms	(GHS01: Explosive) (GHS07: Exclamation mark)
NFPA 704 (fire diamond)	1 4 4

Explosive data
Shock sensitivity	High/High when wet
Friction sensitivity	High/moderate when wet
Detonation velocity	5300 m/s at maximum density (1.18 g/cm^{3}), about 2500–3000 m/s near 0.5 g/cm^{3} 17,384 ft/s 3.29 miles per second
RE factor	0.80
- Except where otherwise noted, data are given for materials in their standard state (at 25 °C [77 °F], 100 kPa). verify (what is ?) Infobox references

Acetone peroxide (/æsəˈtəʊn pɛrˈɒksaɪd/ also called APEX and mother of Satan) is an organic peroxide and a primary explosive. It is produced by the reaction of acetone, hydrogen peroxide and a strong acidic catalyst to yield a mixture of linear monomer and cyclic dimer, trimer, and tetramer forms. In practice it should be done at 0-5C in an ice bath for reaction stability. The monomer is dimethyldioxirane. The dimer is known as diacetone diperoxide (DADP). The trimer is known as triacetone triperoxide (TATP) or tri-cyclic acetone peroxide (TCAP). Acetone peroxide takes the form of a white crystalline powder with a distinctive bleach-like odor when impure, or a fruit-like smell when pure, and can explode powerfully if subjected to heat, friction, static electricity, concentrated sulfuric acid, strong UV radiation, or shock. Until about 2015, explosives detectors were not set to detect non-nitrogenous explosives, as most explosives used preceding 2015 were nitrogen-based. TATP, being nitrogen-free, has been used as the explosive of choice in several terrorist bomb attacks since 2001.

== History ==
Acetone peroxide (specifically, triacetone triperoxide) was discovered in 1895 by a German chemist, Richard Wolffenstein. Wolffenstein combined acetone and hydrogen peroxide. Then he allowed the mixture to stand for a week at room temperature, during which time a small quantity of crystals precipitated, which had a melting point of 97 °C (207 °F).

In 1899, Adolf von Baeyer and Victor Villiger described the first synthesis of the dimer and described use of acids for the synthesis of both peroxides. Baeyer and Villiger prepared the dimer by combining potassium persulfate in diethyl ether with acetone, under cooling. After separating the ether layer, the product was purified and found to melt at 132–133 °C (270–271 °F). They found that the trimer could be prepared by adding hydrochloric acid to a chilled mixture of acetone and hydrogen peroxide. By using the depression of freezing points to determine the molecular weights of the compounds, they also determined that the form of acetone peroxide that they had prepared via potassium persulfate was a dimer, whereas the acetone peroxide that had been prepared via hydrochloric acid was a trimer, like Wolffenstein's compound.

Work on this methodology and on the various products obtained, was further investigated in the mid-20th century by Milas and Golubović.

== Chemistry ==
The chemical name acetone peroxide is most commonly used to refer to the cyclic trimer, the product of a reaction between two precursors, hydrogen peroxide and acetone, in an acid-catalyzed nucleophilic addition, although monomeric and dimeric forms are also possible.

Synthesis of tri-cyclic acetone peroxide.

Specifically, two dimers, one cyclic (C_{6}H_{12}O_{4}, a tetroxane) and one open chain (C_{6}H_{14}O_{4}), as well as an open dihydroperoxide monomer (C_{3}H_{8}O_{4}), can also be formed; under a particular set of conditions of reagent and acid catalyst concentration, the cyclic trimer is the primary product. Under neutral conditions, the reaction is reported to produce the monomeric organic peroxide. A tetrameric form has also been described, under different catalytic conditions, albeit not without disputes and controversy.

The most common route for nearly pure TATP is H_{2}O_{2}/acetone/HCl in 1:1:0.25 molar ratios, using 30% hydrogen peroxide. This product contains very little or none of DADP with some very small traces of chlorinated compounds. Product that contains large fraction of DADP can be obtained from 50% H_{2}O_{2} using large amounts of concentrated sulfuric acid as catalyst or alternatively with 30% H_{2}O_{2} and massive amounts of HCl as a catalyst.

The product made by using hydrochloric acid is regarded as more stable than the one made using sulfuric acid. It is known that traces of sulfuric acid trapped inside the formed acetone peroxide crystals lead to instability. In fact, the trapped sulfuric acid can induce detonation at temperatures as low as 50 °C (122 °F). This is the most likely mechanism behind accidental explosions of acetone peroxide that occur during drying on heated surfaces.

Organic peroxides in general are sensitive, dangerous explosives, and all forms of acetone peroxide are sensitive to initiation. TATP decomposes explosively; examination of the explosive decomposition of TATP at the very edge of detonation front predicts "formation of acetone and ozone as the main decomposition products and not the intuitively expected oxidation products." Very little heat is created by the explosive decomposition of TATP at the very edge of the detonation front; the foregoing computational analysis suggests that TATP decomposition is an entropic explosion. However, this hypothesis has been challenged as not conforming to actual measurements. The claim of entropic explosion has been tied to the events just behind the detonation front. The authors of the 2004 Dubnikova et al. study confirm that a final redox reaction (combustion) of ozone, oxygen and reactive species into water, various oxides and hydrocarbons takes place within about 180 ps after the initial reaction—within about a micron of the detonation wave. Detonating crystals of TATP ultimately reach temperature of 2,300 K (2,030 °C; 3,680 °F) and pressure of 80 kbar. The final energy of detonation is about 2800 kJ/kg (measured in helium), enough to briefly raise the temperature of gaseous products to 2,000 °C (3,630 °F). Volume of gases at STP is 855 L/kg for TATP and 713 L/kg for DADP (measured in helium).

The tetrameric form of acetone peroxide, prepared under neutral conditions using a tin catalyst in the presence of a chelator or general inhibitor of radical chemistry, is reported to be more chemically stable, although still a very dangerous primary explosive. Its synthesis has been disputed.

Both TATP and DADP are liable to loss of mass via sublimation. DADP has lower molecular weight and higher vapor pressure; this results in DADP being more prone to sublimation than TATP. This can lead to dangerous crystal growth when the vapors deposit if the crystals have been stored in a container with a threaded lid. This process of repeated sublimation and deposition also results in a change in crystal size via Ostwald ripening. Several methods can be used for trace analysis of TATP, including gas chromatography-mass spectrometry (GC-MS), high performance liquid chromatography-mass spectrometry (HPLC-MS), and HPLC with post-column derivatization. Acetone peroxide is soluble in toluene, chloroform, acetone, dichloromethane and methanol. Recrystalization of primary explosives may yield large crystals that detonate spontaneously due to internal strain.

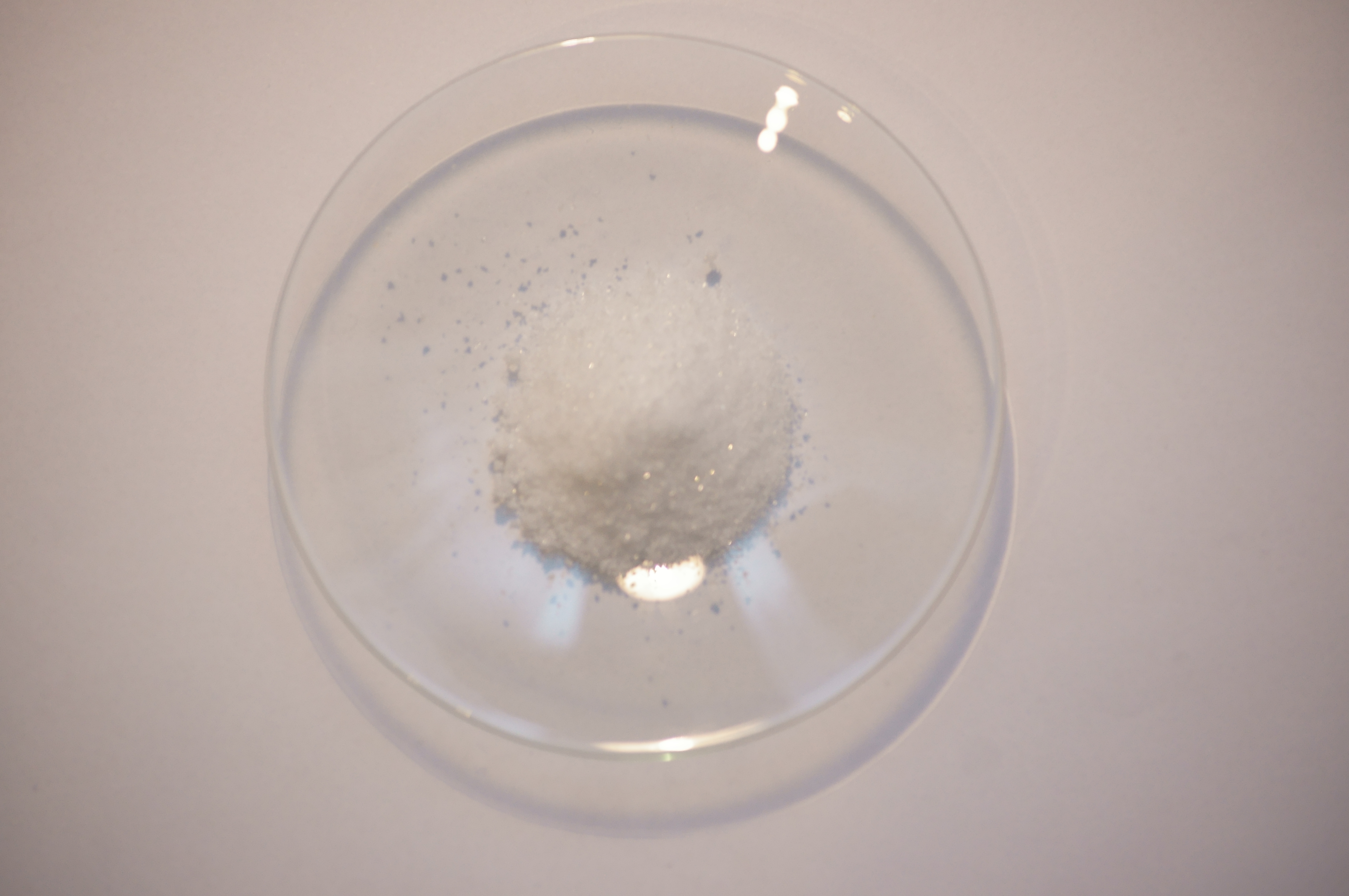
Tetrameric acetone peroxide

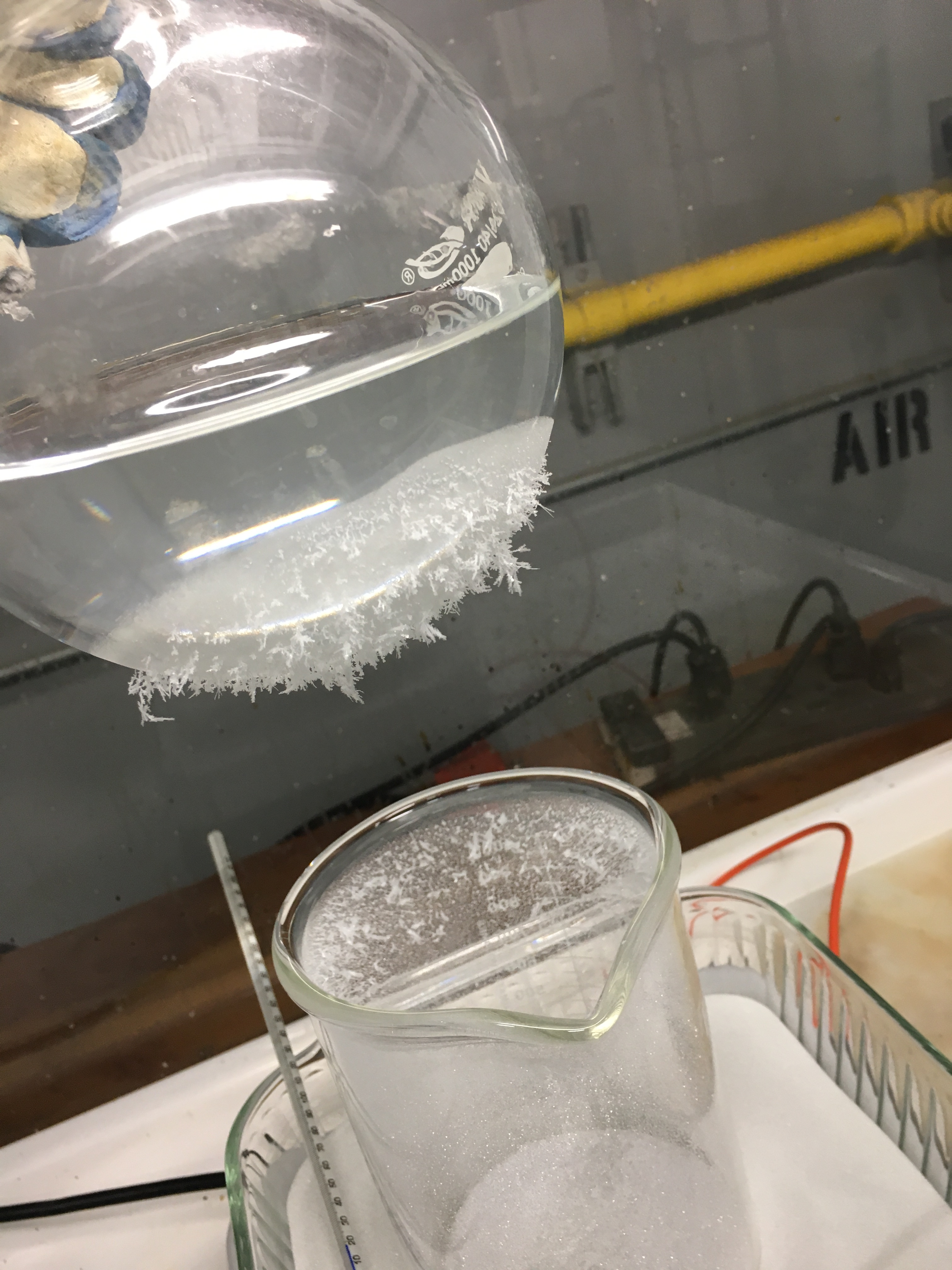
Crystal deposits of sublimed TATP.

== Industrial uses ==
Ketone peroxides, including acetone peroxide and methyl ethyl ketone peroxide, find application as initiators for polymerization reactions, e.g., silicone or polyester resins, in the making of fiberglass-reinforced composites. For these uses, the peroxides are typically in the form of a dilute solution in an organic solvent; methyl ethyl ketone peroxide is more common for this purpose, as it is stable in storage.

Acetone peroxide is used as a flour bleaching agent to bleach and "mature" flour. Acetone peroxides are unwanted by-products of some oxidation reactions such as those used in phenol syntheses. Due to their explosive nature, their presence in chemical processes and chemical samples creates potential hazardous situations. For example, triacetone peroxide is the major contaminant found in diisopropyl ether as a result of photochemical oxidation in air. Accidental occurrence at illicit MDMA laboratories is possible.

Numerous methods are used to reduce their appearance including shifting pH to more alkaline, adjusting reaction temperature, or adding inhibitors of their production.

== Use in improvised explosive devices ==
TATP has been used in bomb and suicide attacks and in improvised explosive devices, including the London bombings on 7 July 2005, where four suicide bombers killed 52 people and injured more than 700. It was one of the explosives used by the "shoe bomber" Richard Reid in his 2001 failed shoe bomb attempt and was used by the suicide bombers in the November 2015 Paris attacks, 2016 Brussels bombings, Manchester Arena bombing, June 2017 Brussels attack, Parsons Green bombing, the Surabaya bombings, and the 2019 Sri Lanka Easter bombings. Hong Kong police claim to have found 2 kg (4.4 lb) of TATP among weapons and protest materials in July 2019, when mass protests were taking place against a proposed law allowing extradition to mainland China. TATP shockwave overpressure is 70% of that for TNT, and the positive phase impulse is 55% of the TNT equivalent. TATP at 0.4 g/cm^{3} has about one-third of the brisance of TNT at 1.2 g/cm^{3} as measured by the Hess test.

TATP is attractive to terrorists because it is easily prepared from readily available retail ingredients like hair bleach and nail polish remover. It was also able to evade detection because it is one of the few high explosives which does not contain nitrogen, and could therefore pass undetected through standard explosive detection scanners, which were hitherto designed to detect nitrogenous explosives. By 2016, explosives detectors had been modified to be able to detect TATP, and new types were developed.

Legislative measures to limit the sale of hydrogen peroxide products to concentrations of 12% or lower for the general public have been made in the European Union. A key disadvantage is the high susceptibility of TATP to accidental detonation, causing injuries and deaths among illegal bomb-makers, which has led to TATP being referred to as the "Mother of Satan". TATP was found in the accidental explosion that preceded the 2017 terrorist attacks in Barcelona and surrounding areas.

Large-scale TATP synthesis is often betrayed by excessive bleach-like or fruity smells. The smell can even penetrate into clothes and hair in amounts that are quite noticeable; this was reported in the 2016 Brussels bombings. TATP was found in the bombs used in the 2026 New York City bombing attempt outside of Gracie Mansion on the Upper East Side of Manhattan, New York, but the devices did not explode.
