= Ballotechnics =

Materials which react under high pressures

In chemistry, ballotechnics are a class of materials that undergo a chemical reaction when quickly subjected to extreme pressures. These pressures are of the order of tens of thousands of atmospheres, and the chemical reactions are initiated by shock waves transmitted through the material. The reaction progresses with little change in volume, and are therefore not "explosive", i.e. the energy is released in the form of heat, rather than work.

== Research ==
While most of the research performed on ballotechnics originates from Sandia National Laboratories, the researchers involved primarily focus on chemical and simulation research, not nuclear weapons research. Other research has been performed at the Georgia Institute of Technology. A critical reevaluation was written in 1995, concluding that shock compression data do not provide evidence for strong exothermic reactions, but this report was not publicly released by Sandia until 2017.

== See also ==
Entropic explosion - The reverse of this, an explosion with a large change in volume but relatively little heat produced.
