= DCUP (disambiguation) =

DCUP (Duncan MacLennan, born 1985) is an Australian music producer.

DCUP can also refer to:

- Dicumyl peroxide, a chemical compound

== See also ==
- Bra size § Consumer measurement methods, for which "D" is a cup size
