= Kornblum–DeLaMare rearrangement =

Rearrangement reaction in organic chemistry

The Kornblum–DeLaMare rearrangement is a rearrangement reaction in organic chemistry in which a primary or secondary organic peroxide is converted to the corresponding ketone and alcohol under acid or base catalysis. The reaction is relevant as a tool in organic synthesis and is a key step in the biosynthesis of prostaglandins.

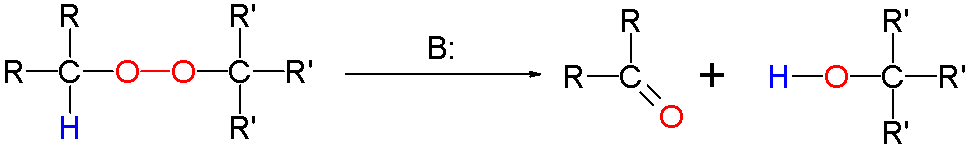

The base can be a hydroxide such as potassium hydroxide or an amine such as triethylamine.

== Reaction mechanism ==
In the reaction mechanism for this organic reaction the base abstracts the acidic α-proton of the peroxide 1 to form the carbanion 4 as a reactive intermediate which rearranges to the ketone 2 with expulsion of the hydroxyl anion 3'. This intermediate gains a proton forming the alcohol 3.

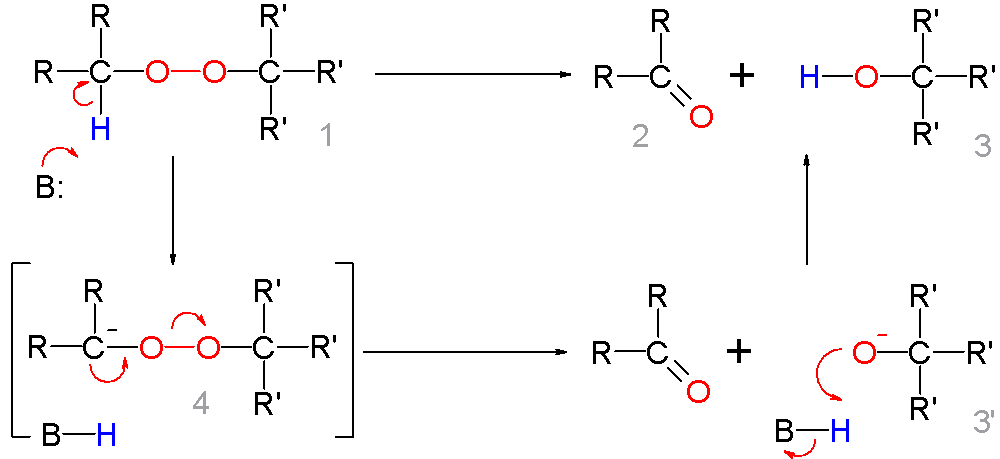

Deprotonation and rearrangement can also be a concerted reaction without formation of 4.

An alternative reaction mechanism involving direct nucleophilic displacement on the peroxide link of the amine followed by an elimination reaction is considered unlikely based on the outcome of this model reaction:

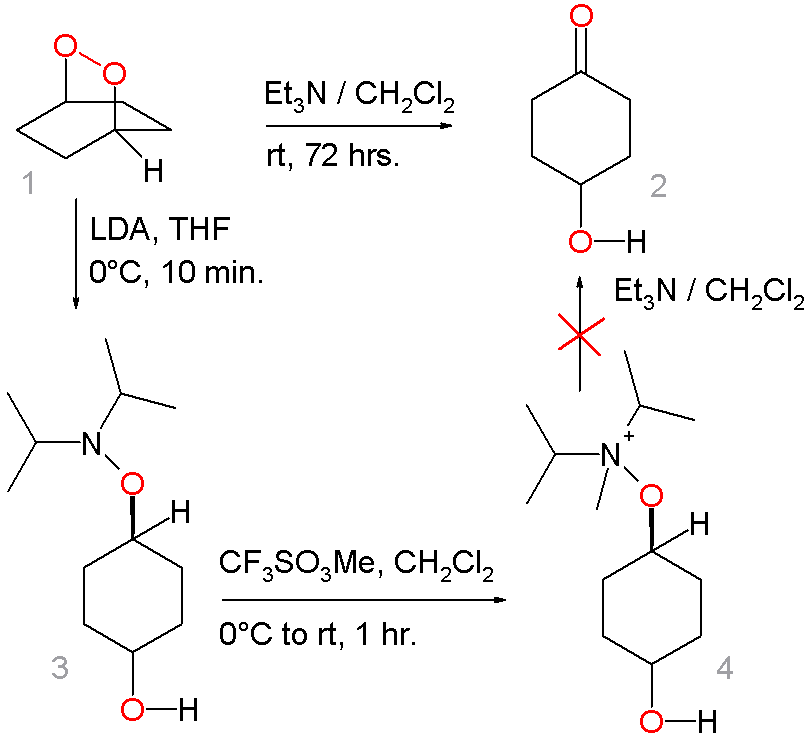

The peroxide 1 converts to the hydroxyketone 2 by action of triethylamine but the alternative route through hydroxylamine 3 by nucleophilic displacement with Lithium diisopropylamide and the ammonium salt 4 (by methylation with methyl trifluoromethanesulfonate) fails.

The reaction, formally a rearrangement, ranks under the elimination reactions as already observed by the original authors. Not only alkoxides but any leaving group capable of carrying a negative charge will do for instance nitrate esters R–C(R)(H)–O–NO_{2}.

== Related reactions ==
The corresponding reaction involving an ether is the 1,2-Wittig rearrangement. The reaction course in this rearrangement is different because ether cleavage with carbanion formation is unfavorable. The Pummerer rearrangement in one of its reaction step contains a sulfur variation.

== Scope ==
The original 1951 publication concerned the conversion of potassium t-butyl peroxide and 1-phenylethyl bromide to ultimately acetophenone and t-butanol with piperidine as the base:

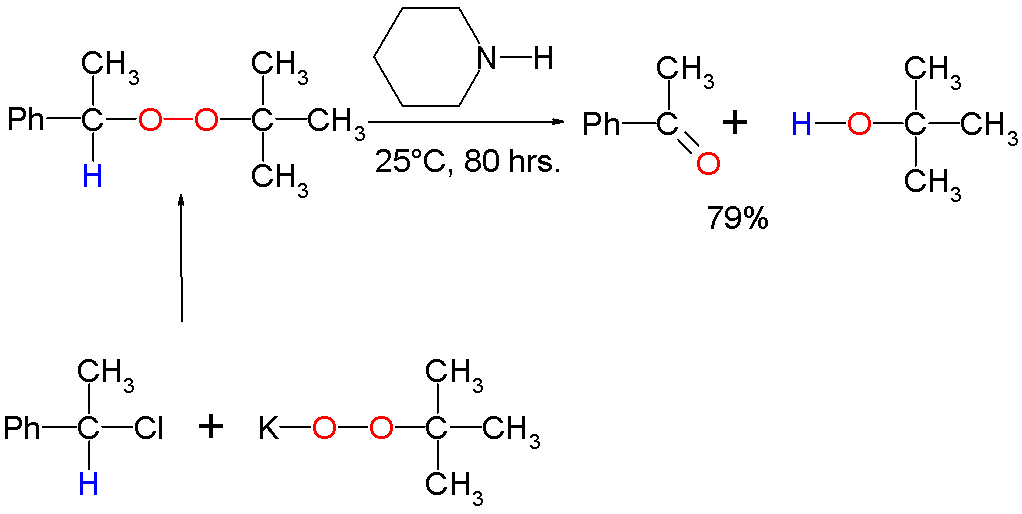

The Kornblum–DeLaMare rearrangement can be carried out as an asymmetric reaction with a suitable chiral amine such as sparteine or a cinchona alkaloid:

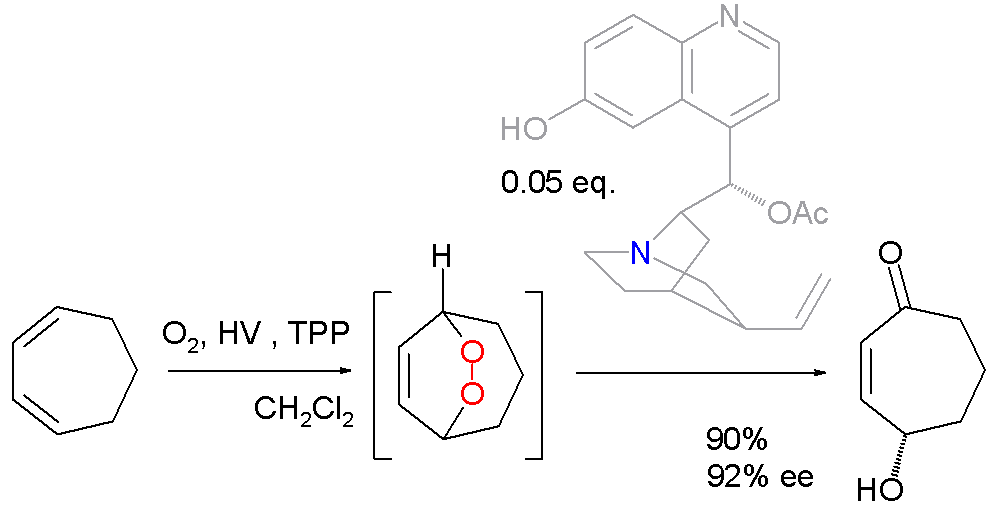

The first step in this one-pot reaction is 1,4-dioxygenation of 1,3-cycloheptadiene with singlet oxygen and a TPP catalyst.
