= Alkenyl peroxides =

Organic compounds of the form R2C=C(R)OOR

General structure of an alkenyl peroxide

In organic chemistry, alkenyl peroxides are organic peroxides bearing an alkene (R_{2}C=CR_{2}) residue directly at the peroxide (R−O−O−R) group, resulting in the general formula R_{2}C=C(R)OOR. They have very weak O-O bonds and are thus generally unstable compounds.

== Properties ==
Alkenyl peroxides decompose readily by homolytic O-O bond cleavage into two radicals, generating an oxyl radical and an alkenyloxyl- or α-oxo-alkyl radical.

Decomposition of alkenyl peroxides by homolytic cleavage of the O-O bond

The significant weakness of the O-O bond can be explained by formation of the resonance stabilized alkenyloxyl radical and the strong carbonyl bond, respectively. This reasoning also applies to aryl peroxides. Both compound classes thus have significantly weaker O-O bonds than other peroxides. Because of this weak bond, alkenyl peroxides are generally only postulated as reactive intermediates. An exception is the case of some few heteroarylperoxides, which were long-lived enough to be characterized.

== Occurrence ==
=== In the atmosphere ===
Alkenyl hydroperoxides (R^{1} = H) have been postulated as reactive intermediates in atmospheric chemistry. They are formed via ozonolysis of alkenes in the atmosphere and form hydroxyl radicals upon decay, which play an important role in the decomposition of pollutants in the air. During day-time, hydroxyl radicals form predominantly photochemically by irradiation with light; whereas in the dark during night-time, the formation via alkenyl peroxides is believed to be their major source.

=== In solution ===
Alkenyl peroxides can be formed by acid catalyzed condensation of ketones with organic hydroperoxides or hydrogen peroxide. This has been suggested based on the characterization of the corresponding products of decomposition. Alkenyl peroxides could also occur as unwanted byproducts in the Baeyer–Villiger oxidation when using hydrogen peroxide, which would diminish the effectiveness of this reaction.

== Applications ==
The radicals formed from alkenyl peroxides can be utilized in organic radical reactions. For example, they can mediate hydrogen atom abstraction reactions and thus lead to the functionalization of C-H bonds, or they can be used to introduce ketone residues by addition of the alkenyloxyl radicals to alkenes.
