= Tert-Butyl peroxybenzoate =

tert-Butyl peroxybenzoate

Names
- Preferred IUPAC name tert-Butyl benzenecarboperoxoate
- Other names tert-Butyl perbenzoate

Identifiers
CAS Number	614-45-9
3D model (JSmol)	Interactive image
ChemSpider	11472
ECHA InfoCard	100.009.440
PubChem CID	11966
UNII	54E39145KT
CompTox Dashboard (EPA)	DTXSID9024699
- InChI: InChI=1S/C11H14O3/c1-11(2,3)14-13-10(12)9-7-5-4-6-8-9/h4-8H,1-3H3 Key: GJBRNHKUVLOCEB-UHFFFAOYSA-N
- SMILES: CC(C)(C)OOC(=O)c1ccccc1

Properties
Chemical formula	C_{11}H_{14}O_{3}
Molar mass	194.230 g·mol^{−1}
Density	1.034 g/cm^{3}
Melting point	8-9 °C
Boiling point	112 °C (decomposes)
- Except where otherwise noted, data are given for materials in their standard state (at 25 °C [77 °F], 100 kPa). Infobox references

tert-Butyl peroxybenzoate (TBPB) an organic compound with the formula C_{6}H_{5}CO_{3}CMe_{3} (Me = CH_{3}). It is the most widely produced perester; it is an ester of peroxybenzoic acid (C_{6}H_{5}CO_{3}H). It is often used as a radical initiator in polymerization reactions, such as the production of LDPE from ethylene, and for crosslinking, such as for unsaturated polyester resins.

== Properties ==
TBPB, which is pale yellow, is exclusively encountered as a solution in solvents such as ethanol or phthalate.

As peroxo compound, TBPB contains about 8.16 wt% of active oxygen and has a self accelerating decomposition temperature (SADT) of about 60 °C. The SADT is the lowest temperature at which self-accelerating decomposition in the transport packaging can occur within a week, and which should not be exceeded while storage or transportation. TBPB should therefore be stored between minimum 10 °C (below solidification) and maximum 50 °C. Dilution with a high-boiling solvent increases the SADT. The half-life of TBPB, in which 50% of the peroxy ester is decomposed, is 10 hours at 104 °C, one hour at 124 °C and one minute at 165 °C. Amines, metal ions, strong acids and bases, as well as strong reducing and oxidizing agents accelerate the decomposition of TBPB even in low concentrations. However, TBPB is one of the safest peresters or organic peroxides in handling. The main decomposition products of tert-butyl peroxybenzoate are carbon dioxide, acetone, methane, tert-butanol, benzoic acid and benzene.

== Production ==
A standard procedure for the preparation of peresters is the acylation of tert-butyl hydroperoxide with benzoyl chloride. In the reaction a large excess of tert-butyl hydroperoxide is used and the hydrogen chloride formed is removed in vacuo whereby a virtually quantitative yield is obtained.

Synthesis of tert-butylperoxybenzoate

== Applications ==
=== In polymer chemistry ===
Primarily, TBPB is used as a radical initiator, either in the polymerization of e.g. ethylene (to LDPE), vinyl chloride, styrene or acrylic esters or as so-called unsaturated polyester resins (UP resins). The quantity used for the curing of UP resins is about 1-2%.

A disadvantage, particularly in the production of polymers for applications in the food or cosmetics sector, is the possible formation of benzene as a decomposition product which can diffuse out of the polymer (for example, an LDPE packaging film).

=== In organic chemistry ===
The protecting group 2-trimethylsilylethanesulfonyl chloride (SES-Cl) for primary and secondary amino groups is accessible by the reaction of vinyltrimethylsilane with sodium hydrogensulfite and TBPB to the sodium salt of trimethylsilylethanesulfonic acid and the subsequent reaction with thionyl chloride to the corresponding sulfonyl chloride.

Synthesis of the protecting group SES-Cl

TBPB can be used to introduce a benzoyloxy group in the allyl position of unsaturated hydrocarbons.

Synthesis of 3-benzoyloxycyclohexene

From cyclohexene, 3-benzoyloxycyclohexene is formed with TBPB in the presence of catalytic amounts of copper(I)bromide in 71 to 80% yield.

This allylic oxidation of alkenes, also known as Kharasch-Sosnovsky oxidation, generates racemic allylic benzoates in the presence of catalytic amounts of copper(I)bromide.

Kharasch-Sosnovsky reaction

A modification of the reaction utilizes copper(II) trifluoromethanesulfonate as a catalyst and DBN or DBU as bases to achieve yields up to 80% in the reaction of acyclic olefins with TBPB to allylic benzoates.

Substituted oxazolines and thiazolines can be oxidized to the corresponding oxazoles and thiazoles in a modified Kharash-Sosnovsky oxidation with TBPB and a mixture of Cu(I) and Cu(II) salts in suitable yields.

Kharasch-Sosnovsky reaction for oxidation of oxazolines and thiazolines

The carboalkoxy group at the C-4 position is essential a successful reaction.

Benzene and furans can be alkenylated with olefins in an oxidative coupling under palladium salt catalysis, with TBPB as hydrogen acceptor.

Oxidative coupling of alkenes and aromatics with TBPB

In the absence of Pd^{2+} salts, the aromatics are benzoxylated.
