= Entropic explosion =

In which reactants change volume without major heat release

An entropic explosion is an explosion in which the reactants undergo a large change in volume without releasing a large amount of heat. The chemical decomposition of triacetone triperoxide (TATP) is an example of an entropic explosion. It is not a thermochemically highly favored event because little energy is generated in chemical bond formation in reaction products, but rather involves an entropy burst, which is the result of formation of one ozone and three acetone gas phase molecules from every molecule of TATP in the solid state.

This hypothesis has been questioned as opposing to other theoretical investigations as well as actual measurements of the detonation heat of TATP. Experiments have shown that the explosion heat of TATP is about 2800 kJ/kg (about 70% of TNT) and that it acts as a usual explosive, producing a mix of hydrocarbons, water and carbon oxides upon detonation.

The authors of the 2005 Dubnikova et al. study confirm that a final redox reaction (combustion) of ozone, oxygen and reactive species into water, various oxides and hydrocarbons takes place within about 180 ps after the initial reaction - within about a micron of the detonation wave. Crystals of TATP ultimately reach a temperature of 2300 K and pressure of 80 kbar.

== See also ==
Ballotechnics - Chemicals that produce the reverse effect, high heat without high change in volume.
