= Iodine test =

Iodine test may refer to:

- Iodine–starch test, a qualitative test for the presence of amylose or α(1→4)-linked glycosidic bonds in starch
- A quantitative test that determines the iodine number, a measure of unsaturation in organic compounds such as oils and fats
