= 1,2-Dioxolane =

Names
- Preferred IUPAC name 1,2-Dioxolane
- Systematic IUPAC name 1,2-Dioxacyclopentane

Identifiers
CAS Number	4362-13-4
3D model (JSmol)	Interactive image
ChemSpider	121835
PubChem CID	138198
CompTox Dashboard (EPA)	DTXSID10195890
- InChI: InChI=1S/C3H6O2/c1-2-4-5-3-1/h1-3H2 Key: SNQXJPARXFUULZ-UHFFFAOYSA-N
- SMILES: C1COOC1

Properties
Chemical formula	C_{3}H_{6}O_{2}
Molar mass	74.079 g·mol^{−1}
- Except where otherwise noted, data are given for materials in their standard state (at 25 °C [77 °F], 100 kPa). Infobox references

1,2-Dioxolane is a chemical compound with formula C_{3}H_{6}O_{2}, consisting of a ring of three carbon atoms and two oxygen atoms in adjacent positions. Its condensed structural formula is [–(CH_{2})_{3}–O–O–].

The compound is an organic peroxide, specifically an endoperoxide, and a structural isomer of the much more common 1,3-dioxolane, which is often called simply "dioxolane".

== Synthesis ==
Synthesis methods for the 1,2-dioxolane core structure include oxidation of cyclopropane derivatives with singlet oxygen or molecular oxygen with a suitable catalyst, the use of autooxidation, nucleophilic displacement with hydrogen peroxide, treatment with mercury(II) nitrate, photolysis of extended π-systems, reaction of a bis-silylperoxide and an alkene, or reaction with a 2-perhydroxy 4-alkene with diethylamine or mercury(II) acetate.

== Occurrence ==
Some derivatives occur naturally, for example in Calophyllum dispar and from the seeds of the mamey (Mammea americana). Plakinic acid A (3,5-peroxy 3Z,5Z,7,11-tetramethyl 13-phenyl-8E,12E-tridecadienoic acid) and similar compounds were isolated from sponges of the Plakortis genus. Nardosinone is a sesquiterpene derivative with a 1,2-dioxolane element isolated from the plant Adenosma caeruleum.

== Uses ==
Synthetic and natural dioxolane derivatives have been used or considered as antimalarial drugs. Plakinic acid A and related compounds showed antifungal action.

== See also ==
- 1,2-Dioxane
- 1,2-Dioxetane
- 1,2-Dithiolane
