= Cobalt(II) naphthenate =

Names
- Other names Naphtolite

Identifiers
CAS Number	61789-51-3
3D model (JSmol)	Interactive image
ChemSpider	21241700
PubChem CID	14048876
RTECS number	QK8925000
- InChI: InChI=1S/2C11H8O2.Co/c2*12-11(13)10-6-5-8-3-1-2-4-9(8)7-10;/h2*1-7H,(H,12,13);/q;;+2/p-2 Key: IFSWBZCGMGEHLE-UHFFFAOYSA-L; InChI=1/2C11H8O2.Co/c2*12-11(13)10-6-5-8-3-1-2-4-9(8)7-10;/h2*1-7H,(H,12,13);/q;;+2/p-2 Key: IFSWBZCGMGEHLE-NUQVWONBAA
- SMILES: c1ccc2cc(ccc2c1)C(=O)[O-].c1ccc2cc(ccc2c1)C(=O)[O-].[Co+2]

Properties
Chemical formula	CoC_{22}H_{14}O_{4}
Molar mass	401.02 g/mol
Appearance	brown amorphous or bluish-red solid
Density	0.96 g/cm^{3}, solid
Melting point	140 °C (284 °F; 413 K)
Boiling point	> 150 °C (302 °F; 423 K)
Solubility in water	none

Hazards
Flash point	48.89 °C (120.00 °F; 322.04 K)
Safety data sheet (SDS)	External SDS
- Except where otherwise noted, data are given for materials in their standard state (at 25 °C [77 °F], 100 kPa). verify (what is ?) Infobox references

Cobalt(II) naphthenate is a mixture of cobalt(II) derivatives of naphthenic acids. These coordination complexes are widely used as oil drying agents for the autoxidative crosslinking of drying oils. Metal naphthenates are not well defined in conventional chemical sense that they are mixtures. They are widely employed catalysts because they are soluble in the nonpolar substrates, such as the alkyd resins or linseed oil. The fact that naphthenates are mixtures helps to confer high solubility. A second virtue of these species is their low cost. A well-defined compound that exhibits many of the properties of cobalt naphthenate is the cobalt(II) complex of 2-ethylhexanoic acid. Often in technical literature, naphthenates are described as salts, but they are probably also non-ionic coordination complexes with structures similar to basic zinc acetate.

The catalytic properties of cobalt(II) naphthenates are similar to those of related compounds containing manganese and iron. Such species are sometimes classified as active driers. Active driers are catalysts that feature redox-active metal centers. Such centers promote redox reactions with hydroperoxide-containing intermediates.

== Toxicity and safety ==
Cobalt Naphthenate is a moderately toxic substance which can cause a range of acute and chronic conditions, and it is also a carcinogen. It is most commonly used diluted in mineral spirit or mineral oil. Safety equipment must be used to avoid eye and skin contact. The pure compound has a high vapor density of 3.9 (air = 1), and a low vapor pressure of 1 mm Hg at 25 °C (77 °F).
