= Strontium phosphide =

Names
- Other names Tristrontium diphosphide

Identifiers
CAS Number	12504-16-4
3D model (JSmol)	Interactive image
ChemSpider	145854
ECHA InfoCard	100.032.422
EC Number	235-678-9
PubChem CID	166710
UN number	2013
CompTox Dashboard (EPA)	DTXSID30894176
- InChI: InChI=1S/2P.3Sr/q2*-3;3*+2 Key: ATAJSUOOOWSVGL-UHFFFAOYSA-N
- SMILES: [P-3].[P-3].[Sr+2].[Sr+2].[Sr+2]

Properties
Chemical formula	P_{2}Sr_{3}
Molar mass	324.8
Appearance	Black crystalline material
Density	2.68 g/cm^{3}
Solubility in water	Decomposes in water

Structure
Crystal structure	cubic

Related compounds
Other anions	Calcium phosphide Barium phosphide
Other cations	Strontium nitride Strontium arsenide
- Except where otherwise noted, data are given for materials in their standard state (at 25 °C [77 °F], 100 kPa). Infobox references

Strontium phosphide is an inorganic compound of strontium and phosphorus with the chemical formula Sr_{3}P_{2}. The compound looks like black crystalline material.

== Synthesis ==
Heating strontium phosphate with soot in an arc furnace:

Sr_{3}(PO_{4})_{2} + 8 C → Sr_{3}P_{2} + 8 CO

Reaction of strontium with red phosphorus at high temperature:

6 Sr + P_{4} → 2 Sr_{3}P_{2}

== Physical properties ==
Strontium phosphide forms black crystals.

Thermally stable, melts at high temperatures.

Dangerous when wet, poison.

== Chemical properties ==
Decomposes with water releasing phosphine:

Sr_{3}P_{2} + 2 H_{2}O → 3 Sr(OH)_{2} + 2 PH_{3}

Reacts with acids:

Sr_{3}P_{2} + 6 HCl → 3 SrCl_{2} + 2 PH_{3}

== Uses ==
It is a highly reactive substance used as a reagent and in the manufacture of chemically reactive devices.
