= Tetroxanes =

Tetroxane
- 1,2,3,4-tetroxane (left), 1,2,3,5-tetroxane (middle), 1,2,4,5-tetroxane (right)

Identifiers
CAS Number	1,2,4,5: 291-15-6
3D model (JSmol)	1,2,3,4: Interactive image; 1,2,3,5: Interactive image; 1,2,4,5: Interactive image
ChemSpider	1,2,4,5: 9688524
PubChem CID	1,2,4,5: 21585022
- InChI: 1,2,3,4: InChI=1S/C2H4O4/c1-2-4-6-5-3-1/h1-2H2 Key: NGCMLEQSKQCTAK-UHFFFAOYSA-N; 1,2,3,5: InChI=1S/C2H4O4/c1-3-2-5-6-4-1/h1-2H2 Key: MIPVDBHPXFHDOD-UHFFFAOYSA-N; 1,2,4,5: InChI=1S/C2H4O4/c1-3-5-2-6-4-1/h1-2H2 Key: UYVWNPAMKCDKRB-UHFFFAOYSA-N
- SMILES: 1,2,3,4: C1OOOOC1; 1,2,3,5: C1OOOCO1; 1,2,4,5: C1OOCOO1

Properties
Chemical formula	C_{2}H_{4}O_{4}
Molar mass	92.050 g·mol^{−1}
- Except where otherwise noted, data are given for materials in their standard state (at 25 °C [77 °F], 100 kPa). Infobox references

In organic chemistry, a tetroxane is a six-membered heterocyclic structure consisting of four oxygen atoms and two carbon atoms. Three different constitutional isomers are possible for the parent structure, depending on the relative positions of the oxygen atoms around the ring: 1,2,3,4-tetroxane, 1,2,3,5-tetroxane, and 1,2,4,5-tetroxane.

The 1,2,4,5-tetroxane structure contains two peroxide regions. It is formally the product of cycloaddition of two carbonyl oxides, though the exact reaction process can vary. Examples include acetone peroxide (from hydrogen peroxide oxidation of acetone), the dimer of oxidized dihydrocarvone analogs (antimalarial activity) mixed-carbonyl-oxide products from a substituted benzaldehydes and a cyclic ketones (antimalarial activity without cytotoxic effects), mixed-carbonyl-oxide products of steroids (antimalarial and antimycobacterial activity, including against tuberculosis pathogens), and products of the Griesbaum coozonolysis (oxidation of O-methyl oximes).

Under controlled conditions, 1,2,4,5-tetroxanes can decompose back to their parent aldehyde and ketone precursors with release of molecular oxygen. This reaction occurs by a stepwise reaction mechanism that begins by breaking of one of the peroxide bonds.
