= Acetozone =

Names
- Preferred IUPAC name Acetic benzoic peroxyanhydride
- Other names Acetyl benzoyl peroxide; Benzoyl acetyl peroxide; Benzozone; Acetyl benzenecarboperoxoate

Identifiers
CAS Number	644-31-5
3D model (JSmol)	Interactive image
ChemSpider	12048
ECHA InfoCard	100.010.376
EC Number	211-412-7
PubChem CID	12568
UNII	5AA81KS1U5
CompTox Dashboard (EPA)	DTXSID9074561
- InChI: InChI=1S/C9H8O4/c1-7(10)12-13-9(11)8-5-3-2-4-6-8/h2-6H,1H3 Key: PDAVOLCVHOKLEO-UHFFFAOYSA-N
- SMILES: CC(=O)OOC(=O)c1ccccc1

Properties
Chemical formula	C_{9}H_{8}O_{4}
Molar mass	180.159 g·mol^{−1}
Appearance	White crystalline solid
Melting point	36–37 °C (97–99 °F; 309–310 K)
Boiling point	130 °C (266 °F; 403 K) (19 mmHg)
Solubility in water	Soluble in carbon tetrachloride, chloroform, ether, and oils
- Except where otherwise noted, data are given for materials in their standard state (at 25 °C [77 °F], 100 kPa). Infobox references

Acetozone is an organic peroxide that is a strong oxidant.

In the early 20th century, it found use as a surgical antiseptic and for the treatment of typhoid fever.

It has also been used as a bleaching agent for flour.
