= Self accelerating decomposition temperature =

Physical phenomenon involving organic peroxide

The self-accelerating decomposition temperature (SADT) is the lowest temperature at which an organic peroxide in a typical vessel or shipping package will undergo a self-accelerating decomposition within one week. The SADT is the point at which the heat evolution from the decomposition reaction and the heat removal rate from the package of interest become unbalanced. When the heat removal is too low, the temperature in the package increases and the rate of decomposition increases in an uncontrollable manner. The result is therefore dependent on the formulation and the package characteristics.

A self-accelerating decomposition occurs when the rate of peroxide decomposition is sufficient to generate heat at a faster rate than it can be dissipated to the environment. Temperature is the main factor in determining the decomposition rate, although the size of the package is also important since its dimensions will determine the ability to dissipate heat to the environment.

All peroxides contain an oxygen-oxygen bond that, on heating, can break apart homolytically to generate two radicals. As mentioned previously, this decomposition also generates heat. But the stability of the oxygen-oxygen bond is dependent on what else is present in the molecule. Some peroxides, due to their chemical make-up, are very unstable and need to be refrigerated to avoid a self-accelerating decomposition. Others, particularly those used for crosslinking purposes, are much more stable and can be stored at normal ambient temperatures without risk of self-acceleration. Due to the large variations in the stabilities of peroxides, each is tested to determine the safe maximum temperature for which the peroxide may be stored, shipped, and handled. The result of this test is the self-accelerating decomposition temperature (SADT).

Although a number of organic peroxides can safely be stored at room temperature, most require some form of temperature control. For long storage periods, the organic peroxide is usually kept at a lower temperature than the maximum safe storage temperature as determined by the SADT.

The SADT for an organic peroxide formulation is usually lower for more concentrated formulations. Dilution with a compatible, high boiling point diluent will usually increase the SADT since the peroxide is dilute and the diluent can absorb much of the heat minimizing the increase in temperature. Also, for an organic peroxide formulation, larger packages generally have a lower SADT because of the poorer heat transfer of the larger package due to lower surface area to volume ratio. Most organic peroxides react to some extent with their decomposition products during thermal decomposition. This often increases the rate since the decomposition proceeds more rapidly as the decomposition products are generated.

The SADT measurement is made as follows:

- The package containing the peroxide is placed in oven set for test temperature
- The timer starts when product reaches 2 °C below intended test temperature
- The oven is held at constant temperature for up to one week or, until a runaway event occurs.
- Test "Passes" if product does not exceed test (oven) temperature by 6 °C within one week
- Test "Fails" if product exceeds test temperature by 6 °C within one week
- The test is repeated in 5 °C increments until a failure is reached
- Fail temperature is reported as SADT for that package and formulation
- Secondary information about the violence of the decomposition can also be recorded

As an alternative to the oven test the SADT for larger packages can be determined by substituting a Dewar flask for the package. The heat transfer of the Dewar flask can be matched to the heat transfer of a larger package size. This test is called the Heat Accumulation Storage Test (HAST).

== Application to polymerizable mixtures ==
Some mixtures containing peroxides and polymerizable monomers may also exhibit SADTs. For example, mixtures of vinyltrimethoxysilane, peroxides and stabilizers are used commercially for cross-linking polyethylene to make PEX pipe. These mixtures are typically liquid solutions that are shipped to where they are used to graft alkoxysilane groups to polyethylene. In such mixtures decomposition of the peroxide can initiate exothermic radical polymerization of the vinyltrimethoxysilane. At low temperature the decomposition rate is slow enough that the stabilizers quench the polymerization before much heat is generated and the container dissipates what heat is produced. At higher temperatures peroxide decomposition is faster, more polymerization occurs to heat the mixture, which in turn increases peroxide decomposition and polymerizes the monomer even faster. The container dissipates heat more slowly in a higher-temperature environment, so at some critical temperature heat is generated by polymerization faster than the container can dissipate it and the reaction self-accelerates. Thus such a mixture has a SADT that depends on container size exactly as in the case of a pure organic peroxide.

== Results ==
When thermal decomposition occurs some organic peroxide formulations release a considerable amount of gases and/or mists. Some, but not all, of these gases may be flammable. For example, carbon dioxide is a common, gaseous decomposition product for diacyl peroxides and peresters that is not flammable.

The decomposition may include small organic fragments such as methane or acetone which are flammable. When flammable gases or mists are released as part of the decomposition there is always the potential danger of a fire or vapor phase explosion. Therefore, the risk of vapor phase explosion should be kept in mind when designing storage structures. These types of materials may be released at low rates during storage and in quite high rates in the event of an upset due to failure to control storage temperature or in the event of a fire in the storage area.

It is the ease of splitting the peroxy group to give two free radicals that makes organic peroxides so useful. However, the presence of energetic free radicals during decomposition, particularly in hot gases or mists, can cause auto-ignition to occur at a lower temperature than would otherwise be normal for a similar chemical structure without the peroxy functional group. Organic peroxides do not usually produce oxygen as part of the decomposition process, so there is little risk of enhanced burning rates due to oxygen enrichment. This is unlike the decomposition of hydrogen peroxide and solid oxidizers that can liberate oxygen.
