= Potassium phosphide =

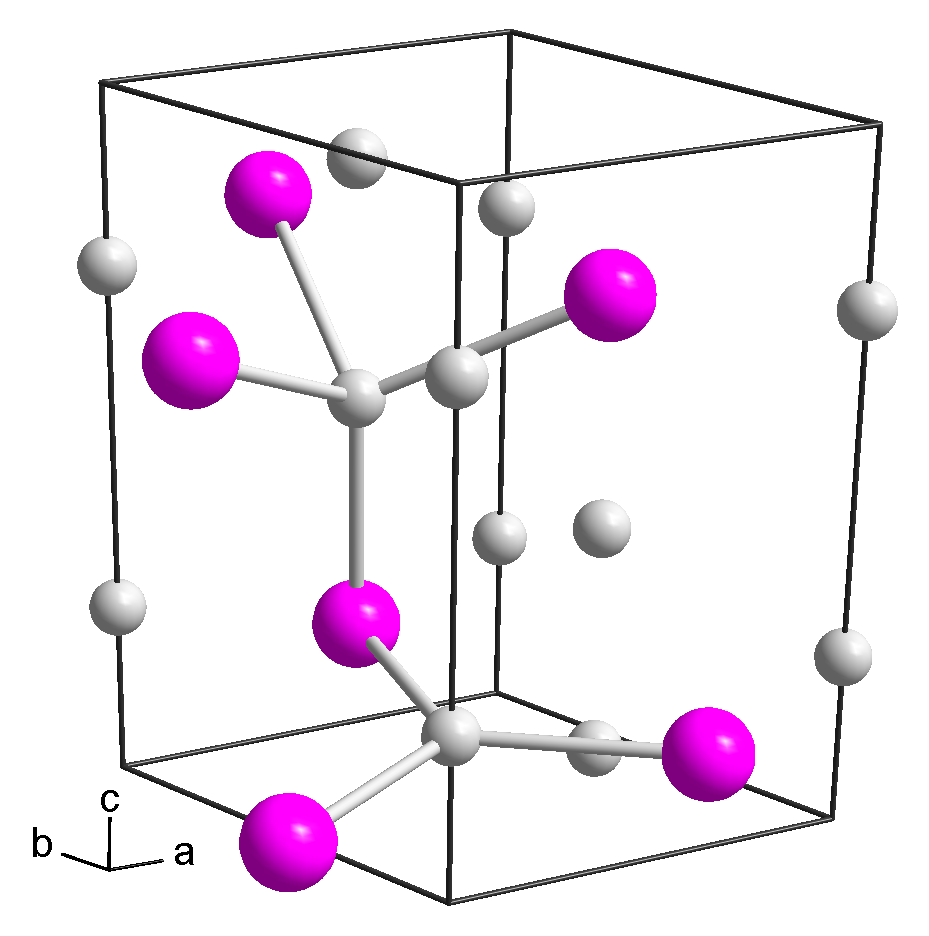
- Crystal structure of potassium phosphide (K_{3}P)

Names
- Other names: Tripotassium;phosphanide; Tripotassium;phosphorus(3-); Tripotassium phosphide

Identifiers
CAS Number	20770-41-6
3D model (JSmol)	Interactive image
ChemSpider	11219118
ECHA InfoCard	100.040.004
EC Number	244-021-5
PubChem CID	22182308
UNII	2F09226A2C
CompTox Dashboard (EPA)	DTXSID6066652
- InChI: InChI=1S/3K.P/q3*+1;-3 Key: YCIITCDBMPCIPR-UHFFFAOYSA-N
- SMILES: [P-3].[K+].[K+].[K+]

Properties
Chemical formula	K_{3}P
Molar mass	148.269 g mol^{−1}
Appearance	Green crystalline solid or powder

Thermochemistry
Std molar entropy (S^{⦵}_{298})	49.8 J mol^{−1} K^{−1}
Std enthalpy of formation (Δ_{f}H^{⦵}_{298})	−1.77 kJ mol^{−1}
- Except where otherwise noted, data are given for materials in their standard state (at 25 °C [77 °F], 100 kPa). Infobox references

Potassium phosphide is an inorganic semiconductor compound with the formula K_{3}P. It appears as a green crystalline solid or powder. It reacts violently with water (even on contact with air) and is toxic via ingestion, inhalation and skin absorption. It has a hexagonal structure.

== Synthesis ==
Potassium phosphide can be synthesised by a reaction under controlled conditions starting from the two elements. Simply fusing potassium and phosphorus does not yield pure K_{3}P:

12 K + P_{4} → 4 K_{3}P

== Applications ==
Potassium phosphide is used in high power, high frequency applications and also in laser diodes.
