= 1,2,3-Trioxolanes =

Class of chemical compounds

General chemical structure of molozonides

In organic chemistry, a 1,2,3-trioxolane, also called a molozonide (short for "molecular ozonide"), is a hetrocyclic structure consisting of a five-membered ring that has two adjacent carbon atoms and three adjacent oxygen atoms. They are thus cyclic disubstituted trioxidane derivatives. Molozonides are formed by cycloaddition of ozone and an alkene during ozonolysis, and are sometimes called primary ozonides in this context. These are transient reaction intermediates that quickly rearrange via the Criegee intermediate to give 1,2,4-trioxolanes (called an ozonides or secondary ozonides in this context) that can react further.
