= Criegee intermediate =

Class of chemical compounds

Criegee zwitterion

A Criegee intermediate (also called a Criegee zwitterion or Criegee biradical) is a carbonyl oxide with two charge centers. These chemicals may react with sulfur dioxide and nitrogen oxides in the Earth's atmosphere, and are implicated in the formation of aerosols, which are an important factor in controlling global climate. Criegee intermediates are also an important source of OH (hydroxyl radicals). OH radicals are the most important oxidant in the troposphere, and are important in controlling air quality and pollution.

The formation of this sort of structure was first postulated in the 1950s by Rudolf Criegee, for whom it is named. It was not until 2012 that direct detection of such chemicals was reported. Infrared spectroscopy suggests the electronic structure has a substantially zwitterionic character rather than the biradical character that had previously been proposed.

== Formation ==
Ozone reacts with an alkene to form a carbonyl and a carbonyl oxide, known as a Criegee intermediate.

Criegee intermediates are formed by the gas-phase reactions of alkenes and ozone in the Earth's atmosphere. Ozone adds across the carbon–carbon double bond of the alkene to form a molozonide (1,2,3-trioxolane), which then decomposes to produce a carbonyl (RR'CO) and a carbonyl oxide. The latter is known as the Criegee intermediate.

The alkene ozonolysis reaction is extremely exothermic, releasing about 50 kilocalories per mole (210 kJ/mol) of excess energy. Therefore, the Criegee intermediates are formed with a large amount of internal energy.

== Removal ==
When Criegee intermediates are formed, some portion of them will undergo prompt unimolecular decay, producing OH radicals and other products. However, they may instead become stabilized by interactions with other molecules or react with other chemicals to give different products.

Criegee intermediates may be collisionally stabilized via collisions with other molecules in the atmosphere. These stabilized Criegee intermediates may then undergo thermal unimolecular decay to OH radicals and other products, or may undergo bimolecular reactions with other atmospheric species.

In the ozonolysis reaction sequence, the Criegee intermediate reacts with another carbonyl compound (generally the aldehyde or ketone byproduct of the Criegee-intermediate formation reaction itself) to form an ozonide (1,2,4-trioxolane).
