= 1,2,4-Trioxolanes =

Class of chemical compounds

1,2,4-Trioxolane

Names
- Other names Ethylene ozonide

Identifiers
CAS Number	289-14-5
3D model (JSmol)	Interactive image
ChEBI	CHEBI:155931
ChemSpider	71300
- InChI: InChI=1S/C2H4O3/c1-3-2-5-4-1/h1-2H2 Key: RZYIPLSVRHWROD-UHFFFAOYSA-N
- SMILES: C1OCOO1

Properties
Chemical formula	C_{2}H_{4}O_{3}
Molar mass	76.051 g·mol^{−1}
- Except where otherwise noted, data are given for materials in their standard state (at 25 °C [77 °F], 100 kPa). Infobox references

General chemical structure of 1,2,4-trioxolanes

In organic chemistry, a 1,2,4-trioxolane is a hetrocyclic structure consisting of a five-membered ring that has two nonadjacent carbon atoms and three oxygen atoms. These structures are formed by cycloaddition a carbonyl oxide (the Criegee intermediate) and a carbonyl, such as during ozonolysis of alkenes or the Griesbaum coozonolysis of O-methyl oximes. They are sometimes called ozonides or secondary ozonides in the context of alkene-ozonolysis.
