= C2H4O2 =

Index of chemical compounds with the same molecular formula and bond

C_{2}H_{4}O_{2} may refer to:

Compounds sharing the molecular formula:

- Acetic acid
- Dihydroxyethene isomers:
  - 1,1-Dihydroxyethene
  - (E)-1,2-Dihydroxyethene
  - (Z)-1,2-Dihydroxyethene
- Dioxetane isomers:
  - 1,2-Dioxetane
  - 1,3-Dioxetane
- Glycolaldehyde
- Methyldioxirane
- Methyl formate
- Oxiranol
