= Atomic lattice =

Atomic lattice may refer to:

- In mineralogy, atomic lattice refers to the arrangement of atoms into a crystal structure.
- In order theory, a lattice is called an atomic lattice if the underlying partial order is atomic.
- In chemistry, atomic lattice refers to the arrangement of atoms in an atomic crystalline solid.
