= Dioxetane =

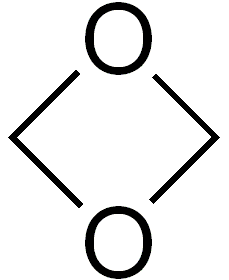
1,2-Dioxetane · 1,3-dioxetane

A dioxetane or dioxacyclobutane is an organic compound with formula C_{2}O_{2}H_{4}, whose backbone is a four-membered ring of two oxygen atoms and two carbon atoms. There are two isomers:

- 1,2-dioxetane where the oxygen atoms are adjacent.
- 1,3-dioxetane where the oxygen and carbon atoms alternate.
