= Raymond Chang (chemist) =

American chemist (1939–2017)

Raymond Chang (March 6, 1939 – April 10, 2017) was an emeritus professor at Williams College in the Department of Chemistry and a textbook author. His most popular textbook was titled Chemistry, which was published up to the thirteenth edition. He also published a few children's books.

He was a naturalized American citizen who came from Hong Kong to America to start graduate studies at Yale University. There he received both his master's and PhD degrees. His family was originally from Shanghai, but Chang was born in Hong Kong as a result of his family's deportation in 1937. They left to escape the Japanese invasion of China. However, in 1941, Chang and his family returned to Shanghai for eight years before they again re-returned to Hong Kong. As a result of his forced movement through different regions of China Chang became fluent in many Chinese dialects. At the age of seventeen, Chang followed his sister to London. He received his B.Sc. with a first-class honors degree in chemistry from the University of London and Ph. D. from Yale University. He completed his postdoctoral research at Washington University in St. Louis and served as a professor at Hunter College of the City University of New York, prior to joining the faculty at Williams College in 1968.

On August 3, 1968, he married Margaret A. Scrogin. They had one daughter, Elizabeth Chang.

Chang died in April 2017 on Bainbridge Island, Washington, at the age of 78.

== Career ==
Chang's history was very rich and varied. In 1966, he began his career as a postdoctoral research fellow at Washington University in St. Louis, MO. After that, he became an assistant professor of chemistry at Hunter College part of City University of New York, in New York City. Chang distinguished himself between 1968 and 1973, as he was the only Asian American who worked at Williams College in that time. Subsequently, from 1978 to 1989 he worked as professor of chemistry at Halford R. Clark Professor of Natural Sciences. By 1993 he went on to chair the department for two years.

In the late 1970s and through the 1980s, Chang worked as a visiting scientist at various schools, including the University of California, where he worked in the Lawrence Radiation Laboratory and the Laboratory of Chemical Biodynamics. He also held positions at Stanford University, Amherst College, and on the Olympiad Examinations Task Force.

He was a member of the American Chemical Society, where he contributed to the examination committees for physical chemistry and general chemistry, and the American Association for the Advancement of Science. Chang contributed numerous articles to chemistry journals, and he was a member of the editorial board of Chemical Educator. He also authored or contributed to instructor's manuals, workbooks, and study guides that accompanied his chemistry texts.
