= Oxiranol =

Organic chemical

Names
- Preferred IUPAC name Oxiranol
- Other names: 2-Oxiranol; Epoxyethanol; Hydroxyoxirane; Oxacyclopropanol

Identifiers
CAS Number	113403-04-6
3D model (JSmol)	Interactive image
ChemSpider	11226930
PubChem CID	12741293
UNII	UQQ9EX9UDA
CompTox Dashboard (EPA)	DTXSID101336384
- InChI: InChI=1S/C2H4O2/c3-2-1-4-2/h2-3H,1H2 Key: DOAMZWOPDPPKJS-UHFFFAOYSA-N
- SMILES: C1OC1O

Properties
Chemical formula	C_{2}H_{4}O_{2}
Molar mass	60.052 g·mol^{−1}
- Except where otherwise noted, data are given for materials in their standard state (at 25 °C [77 °F], 100 kPa). Infobox references

Oxiranol is an organic chemical that is an alcohol derivative of oxirane. It consists of a hydroxy group as substituent on ethylene oxide. It can have two enantiomeric forms. The compound has been proposed as an intermediate in the interstellar formation of glycolaldehyde (a constitutional isomer of oxiranol) and the oxidation of acrolein in the environment.

It can be produced by reacting carbene with formic acid. To reduce the co-production of by-products, a mixture of diiodomethane (CH_{2}I_{2}) and zinc (with copper as catalyst) can be used as a carbene source. The production of carbene with this mixture favors the production of cyclic derivatives.
