= Bonding in solids =

Classification of bondings

Solids can be classified according to the nature of the bonding between their atomic or molecular components. The traditional classification distinguishes four kinds of bonding:

- Covalent bonding, which forms network covalent solids (sometimes called simply "covalent solids")
- Ionic bonding, which forms ionic solids
- Metallic bonding, which forms metallic solids
- Weak inter molecular bonding, which forms molecular solids (sometimes anomalously called "covalent solids")

Typical members of these classes have distinctive electron distributions, thermodynamic, electronic, and mechanical properties. In particular, the binding energies of these interactions vary widely. Bonding in solids can be of mixed or intermediate kinds, however, hence not all solids have the typical properties of a particular class, and some can be described as intermediate forms.

== Basic classes of solids ==
=== Network covalent solids ===
A network covalent solid consists of atoms held together by a network of covalent bonds (pairs of electrons shared between atoms of similar electronegativity), and hence can be regarded as a single, large molecule. The classic example is diamond; other examples include silicon, quartz and graphite.

==== Properties ====
- High strength (with the exception of graphite)
- High elastic modulus
- High melting point
- Brittle

Their strength, stiffness, and high melting points are consequences of the strength and stiffness of the covalent bonds that hold them together. They are also characteristically brittle because the directional nature of covalent bonds strongly resists the shearing motions associated with plastic flow, and are, in effect, broken when shear occurs. This property results in brittleness for reasons studied in the field of fracture mechanics. Network covalent solids vary from insulating to semiconducting in their behavior, depending on the band gap of the material.

=== Ionic solids ===
A standard ionic solid consists of atoms held together by ionic bonds, that is by the electrostatic attraction of opposite charges (the result of transferring electrons from atoms with lower electronegativity to atoms with higher electronegativity). Among the ionic solids are compounds formed by alkali and alkaline earth metals in combination with halogens; a classic example is table salt, sodium chloride.

Ionic solids are typically of intermediate strength and extremely brittle. Melting points are typically moderately high, but some combinations of molecular cations and anions yield an ionic liquid with a freezing point below room temperature. Vapour pressures in all instances are extraordinarily low; this is a consequence of the large energy required to move a bare charge (or charge pair) from an ionic medium into free space.

=== Metallic solids ===
Metallic solids are held together by a high density of shared, delocalized electrons, resulting in metallic bonding. Classic examples are metals such as copper and aluminum, but some materials are metals in an electronic sense but have negligible metallic bonding in a mechanical or thermodynamic sense (see intermediate forms). Metallic solids have, by definition, no band gap at the Fermi level and hence are conducting.

Solids with purely metallic bonding are characteristically ductile and, in their pure forms, have low strength. Melting points can vary widely, from very low (e.g., Mercury melts at 234 K (−39 °C)) to extremely high (Tungsten melts at 3695 K (3422 °C)). However, almost all metals, with the exception of the alkali metals and Group 12 metals, have high boiling points. These properties are consequences of the non-directional and non-polar nature of metallic bonding, which allows atoms (and planes of atoms in a crystal lattice) to move past one another without disrupting their bonding interactions. Metals can be strengthened by introducing crystal defects (for example, by alloying) that interfere with the motion of dislocations that mediate plastic deformation. Further, some transition metals exhibit directional bonding in addition to metallic bonding; this increases shear strength and reduces ductility, imparting some of the characteristics of a covalent solid (an intermediate case below).

== Solids of intermediate kinds ==
The four classes of solids permit six pairwise intermediate forms:

=== Ionic to network covalent ===
Covalent and ionic bonding form a continuum, with ionic character increasing with increasing difference in the electronegativity of the participating atoms. Covalent bonding corresponds to sharing of a pair of electrons between two atoms of essentially equal electronegativity (for example, C–C and C–H bonds in aliphatic hydrocarbons). As bonds become more polar, they become increasingly ionic in character. Metal oxides vary along the iono-covalent spectrum. The Si–O bonds in quartz, for example, are polar yet largely covalent, and are considered to be of mixed character.

=== Metallic to network covalent ===
What is in most respects a purely covalent structure can support metallic delocalization of electrons; metallic carbon nanotubes are one example. Transition metals and intermetallic compounds based on transition metals can exhibit mixed metallic and covalent bonding, resulting in high shear strength, low ductility, and elevated melting points; a classic example is tungsten.

=== Molecular to network covalent ===
Materials can be intermediate between molecular and network covalent solids either because of the intermediate organization of their covalent bonds, or because the bonds themselves are of an intermediate kind.

Intermediate organization of covalent bonds:

Regarding the organization of covalent bonds, recall that classic molecular solids, as stated above, consist of small, non-polar covalent molecules. The example given, paraffin wax, is a member of a family of hydrocarbon molecules of differing chain lengths, with high-density polyethylene at the long-chain end of the series. High-density polyethylene can be a strong material: when the hydrocarbon chains are well aligned, the resulting fibers rival the strength of steel. The covalent bonds in this material form extended structures, but do not form a continuous network. With cross-linking, however, polymer networks can become continuous, and a series of materials spans the range from Cross-linked polyethylene, to rigid thermosetting resins, to hydrogen-rich amorphous solids, to vitreous carbon, diamond-like carbons, and ultimately to diamond itself. As this example shows, there can be no sharp boundary between molecular and network covalent solids.

Intermediate kinds of bonding:

A solid with extensive hydrogen bonding will be considered a molecular solid, yet strong hydrogen bonds can have a significant degree of covalent character. As noted above, covalent and ionic bonds form a continuum between shared and transferred electrons; covalent and weak bonds form a continuum between shared and unshared electrons. In addition, molecules can be polar, or have polar groups, and the resulting regions of positive and negative charge can interact to produce electrostatic bonding resembling that in ionic solids.

=== Molecular to ionic ===
A large molecule with an ionized group is technically an ion, but its behavior may be largely the result of non-ionic interactions. For example, sodium stearate (the main constituent of traditional soaps) consists entirely of ions, yet it is a soft material quite unlike a typical ionic solid. There is a continuum between ionic solids and molecular solids with little ionic character in their bonding.

=== Metallic to molecular ===
Metallic solids are bound by a high density of shared, delocalized electrons. Although weakly bound molecular components are incompatible with strong metallic bonding, low densities of shared, delocalized electrons can impart varying degrees of metallic bonding and conductivity overlaid on discrete, covalently bonded molecular units, especially in reduced-dimensional systems. Examples include charge transfer complexes.

=== Metallic to ionic ===
The charged components that make up ionic solids cannot exist in the high-density sea of delocalized electrons characteristic of strong metallic bonding. Some molecular salts, however, feature both ionic bonding among molecules and substantial one-dimensional conductivity, indicating a degree of metallic bonding among structural components along the axis of conductivity. Examples include tetrathiafulvalene salts.

== See also ==
- Solid
- Metallic bonding
- Molecular solid
- Covalent bond
- Ionic compound
