= Methyldioxirane =

Names
- IUPAC name 3-Methyldioxirane
- Other names Methyldioxirane

Identifiers
| CAS Number | 70308-85-9 |
| 3D model (JSmol) | Interactive image |
| ChemSpider | 394726 |
| PubChem CID | 447710 |
| CompTox Dashboard (EPA) | DTXSID30332260 |
- InChI: InChI=1S/C2H4O2/c1-2-3-4-2/h2H,1H3 Key: NOZLREUTKGWBPY-UHFFFAOYSA-N
- SMILES: CC1OO1

Properties
| Chemical formula | C_{2}H_{4}O_{2} |
| Molar mass | 60.052 g·mol^{−1} |
- Except where otherwise noted, data are given for materials in their standard state (at 25 °C [77 °F], 100 kPa). Infobox references

Methyldioxirane is an organic chemical consisting of a methyl group as substituent on a dioxirane ring. It is a highly unstable structure that has been proposed as part of a decomposition reaction of acetaldehyde oxide, the Criegee intermediate during some ozonolysis reactions. The methyl group helps reduce the rate of ring-opening of the dioxirane, but it does not become usefully stable until a second substient is present as in the structure of dimethyldioxirane.
