= Network solid =

Type of chemical bonding

A network solid or covalent network solid (also called atomic crystalline solids or giant covalent structures) is a chemical compound (or element) in which the atoms are bonded by covalent bonds in a continuous network extending throughout the material. In a network solid there are no individual molecules, and the entire crystal or amorphous solid may be considered a macromolecule. Formulas for network solids, like those for ionic compounds, are simple ratios of the component atoms represented by a formula unit.

Examples of network solids include diamond with a continuous network of carbon atoms and silicon dioxide or quartz with a continuous three-dimensional network of SiO_{2} units. Graphite and the mica group of silicate minerals structurally consist of continuous two-dimensional sheets covalently bonded within the layer, with other bond types holding the layers together. Disordered network solids are termed glasses. These are typically formed on rapid cooling of melts so that little time is left for atomic ordering to occur.

== Properties ==
- Hardness: Very hard, due to the strong covalent bonds throughout the lattice (deformation can be easier, however, in directions that do not require the breaking of any covalent bonds, as with flexing or sliding of sheets in graphite or mica).
- Melting point: High, since melting means breaking covalent bonds (rather than merely overcoming weaker intermolecular forces).
- Solid-phase electrical conductivity: Variable, depending on the nature of the bonding: network solids in which all electrons are used for sigma bonds (e.g. diamond, quartz) are poor conductors, as there are no delocalized electrons. However, network solids with delocalized pi bonds (e.g. graphite) or dopants can exhibit metal-like conductivity.
- Liquid-phase electrical conductivity: Low, as the macromolecule consists of neutral atoms, meaning that melting does not free up any new charge carriers (as it would for an ionic compound).
- Solubility: Generally insoluble in any solvent due to the difficulty of solvating such a large molecule.

== Examples ==
- Boron nitride (BN)
- Diamond (carbon, C)
- Quartz (SiO_{2})
- Rhenium diboride (ReB_{2})
- Silicon carbide (moissanite, carborundum, SiC)
- Silicon (Si)
- Germanium (Ge)
- Aluminium nitride (AlN)
- α-tin allotrope (gray tin, Sn)

== See also ==
- Bonding in solids - overview of different bonding types in solids
- Molecular solids - materials containing discrete molecules held together by weak intermolecular bonds
- Ionic solids (salts) - materials with a network of strong ionic bonds rather than covalent bonds
- Metals - materials held together by strong metallic bonding rather than covalent bonds
- Layered materials - materials with networks of strong bonds within two-dimensional sheets with much weaker bonds between the sheets
- Polymers - materials with strong bonds within one-dimensional chains and much weaker bonds between the chains
