= 1,2-Dioxetane =

4-sided ring molecule (C2H2O4)

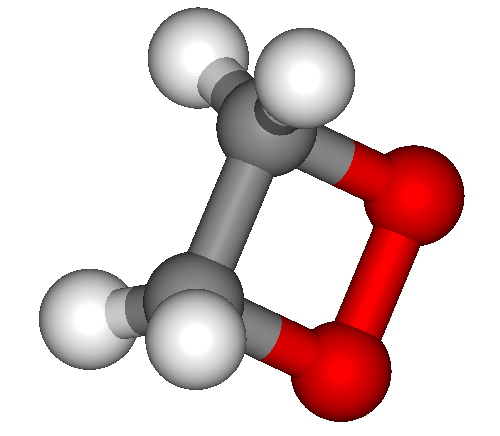

Names
- Preferred IUPAC name 1,2-Dioxetane
- Systematic IUPAC name 1,2-Dioxacyclobutane
- Other names Ethylene peroxide Peroxyethane

Identifiers
CAS Number	6788-84-7
3D model (JSmol)	Interactive image; Interactive image
ChemSpider	108850
PubChem CID	122029
UNII	142GQA523X
CompTox Dashboard (EPA)	DTXSID20218105
- InChI: InChI=1S/C2H4O2/c1-2-4-3-1/h1-2H2 Key: BVTJGGGYKAMDBN-UHFFFAOYSA-N; InChI=1/C2H4O2/c1-2-4-3-1/h1-2H2 Key: BVTJGGGYKAMDBN-UHFFFAOYAG
- SMILES: C1OOC1; O1OCC1

Properties
Chemical formula	C_{2}H_{4}O_{2}
Molar mass	60.052 g·mol^{−1}
- Except where otherwise noted, data are given for materials in their standard state (at 25 °C [77 °F], 100 kPa). verify (what is ?) Infobox references

The chemical substance 1,2-dioxetane (systematically named 1,2-dioxacyclobutane, also known as ethylene peroxide or peroxyethane) is a heterocyclic, organic compound with formula C_{2}O_{2}H_{4}, containing a ring of two adjacent oxygen atoms and two adjacent carbon atoms. It is therefore an organic peroxide, and can be viewed as a dimer of formaldehyde (COH_{2}).

== Luminescence ==
Chemiluminescence was first observed with lophine (triphenylimidazole). When in basic solution, this compound converts to the imidazolate, which reacts with oxygen to eventually give the 1,2-dioxetane. Fragmentation of the dioxetane gives the excited state of an anionic diamide.

Steps leading up to chemiluminescence of lophine.

In the 1960s, 1,2-dioxetane were demonstrated as intermediates in the reactions responsible for the bioluminescence in fireflies, glow-worms, and other luminescent creatures. The luminescence of glowsticks and luminescent bangles and necklaces involves 1,2-dioxetanedione (C_{2}O_{4}), another dioxetane derivative that decomposes to carbon dioxide. Other dioxetane derivatives are used in clinical analysis, where their light emission (which can be measured even at very low levels) allows chemists to detect very low concentrations of body fluid constituents.

== Derivatives ==
In 1968 the first example of a stable dioxetane derivative was made at the University of Alberta in Edmonton: 3,3,4-trimethyl-1,2-dioxetane, prepared as a yellow solution in benzene. When heated to 333 K, it decomposed smoothly (rather than explosively, as many peroxides do) to acetone and acetaldehyde with the emission of pale blue light.

The second example of a dioxetane derivative was made shortly after: the symmetrical compound 3,3,4,4-tetramethyl-1,2-dioxetane, obtained as pale yellow crystals that sublimed even when kept in the refrigerator. Benzene solutions of this compound also decomposed smoothly with the emission of blue light. By adding compounds that normally fluoresce in UV light the colour of the emitted light could be altered.

== Carbon monoxide generation ==
The dioxetane intermediate can release carbon monoxide and has been explored as a pro-drug.

- Peroxidation of heme at the alpha-methine bridge generates carbon monoxide and forms biliverdin as a non-enzymatic alternative pathway to heme oxygenase
- Lipid peroxidation

Peroxidation of the reactive enol of alpha keto acids, such as the tautomer of phenylpyruvic acid at the benzylic carbon, can form a fluorescing 1,2-dioxetane to generate benzaldehyde and oxalic acid. Alternatively, a peroxylactone can form (alpha-keto-beta-peroxylactone) which also forms benzaldehyde but liberates carbon dioxide and carbon monoxide.

== See also ==
- 1,3-Dioxetane
