= 1,3-Dioxetane =

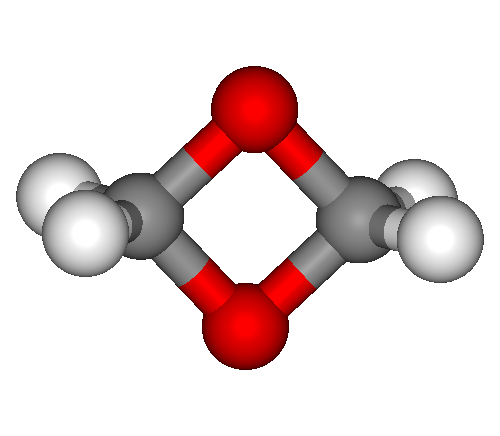

Names
- Preferred IUPAC name 1,3-Dioxetane
- Other names 1,3-Dioxacyclobutane

Identifiers
CAS Number	287-50-3
3D model (JSmol)	Interactive image; Interactive image
ChemSpider	126850
PubChem CID	143777
UNII	GJ6C953QG4
CompTox Dashboard (EPA)	DTXSID40210146
- InChI: InChI=1S/C2H4O2/c1-3-2-4-1/h1-2H2 Key: GFAJOMHUNNCCJQ-UHFFFAOYSA-N; InChI=1/C2H4O2/c1-3-2-4-1/h1-2H2 Key: GFAJOMHUNNCCJQ-UHFFFAOYAT
- SMILES: C1OCO1; O1COC1

Properties
Chemical formula	C_{2}H_{4}O_{2}
Molar mass	60.052 g·mol^{−1}
- Except where otherwise noted, data are given for materials in their standard state (at 25 °C [77 °F], 100 kPa). verify (what is ?) Infobox references

1,3-Dioxetane (1,3-dioxacyclobutane) is a heterocyclic organic compound with formula C_{2}O_{2}H_{4}, whose backbone is a four-member ring of alternating oxygen and carbon atoms. It can be viewed as a dimer of formaldehyde (COH_{2}).

Derivatives of 1,3-dioxetane are rarely encountered as intermediates in the literature. Usually, they are prepared via [2+2] cycloadditions of two carbonyl compounds. Molecular orbital theory calculations suggest that they should be more stable than the 1,2-isomers, which are more intensively studied.

== See also ==
- 1,2-Dioxetane
