= C8H7NO4 =

The molecular formula C_{8}H_{7}NO_{4} (molar mass: 181.15 g/mol) may refer to:

- 3-Aminophthalic acid
- Homoquinolinic acid (HQA)
- (2-Nitrophenyl)acetic acid
- Uvitonic acid, or 6-methyl-2,4-pyridinedicarboxylic acid
