= Po2 =

Po2, pO_{2}, PO_{2}, or PO2 may refer to:

- A military rank:
  - Petty Officer 2nd Class in the Canadian military
  - Petty Officer Second Class in the United States military
- Polikarpov Po-2 or U-2, a Soviet aeroplane
- Partial pressure of Oxygen, that is, amount of oxygen in the blood (normally referred to as Dissolved Oxygen)
- PO_{2}: Phosphorus dioxide, a gaseous free radical that plays a role in the chemiluminescence of phosphorus and phosphine.
- Po^{2−}: Polonide anion
- a power of two in mathematics
