= Horseradish peroxidase =

Chemical compound and enzyme

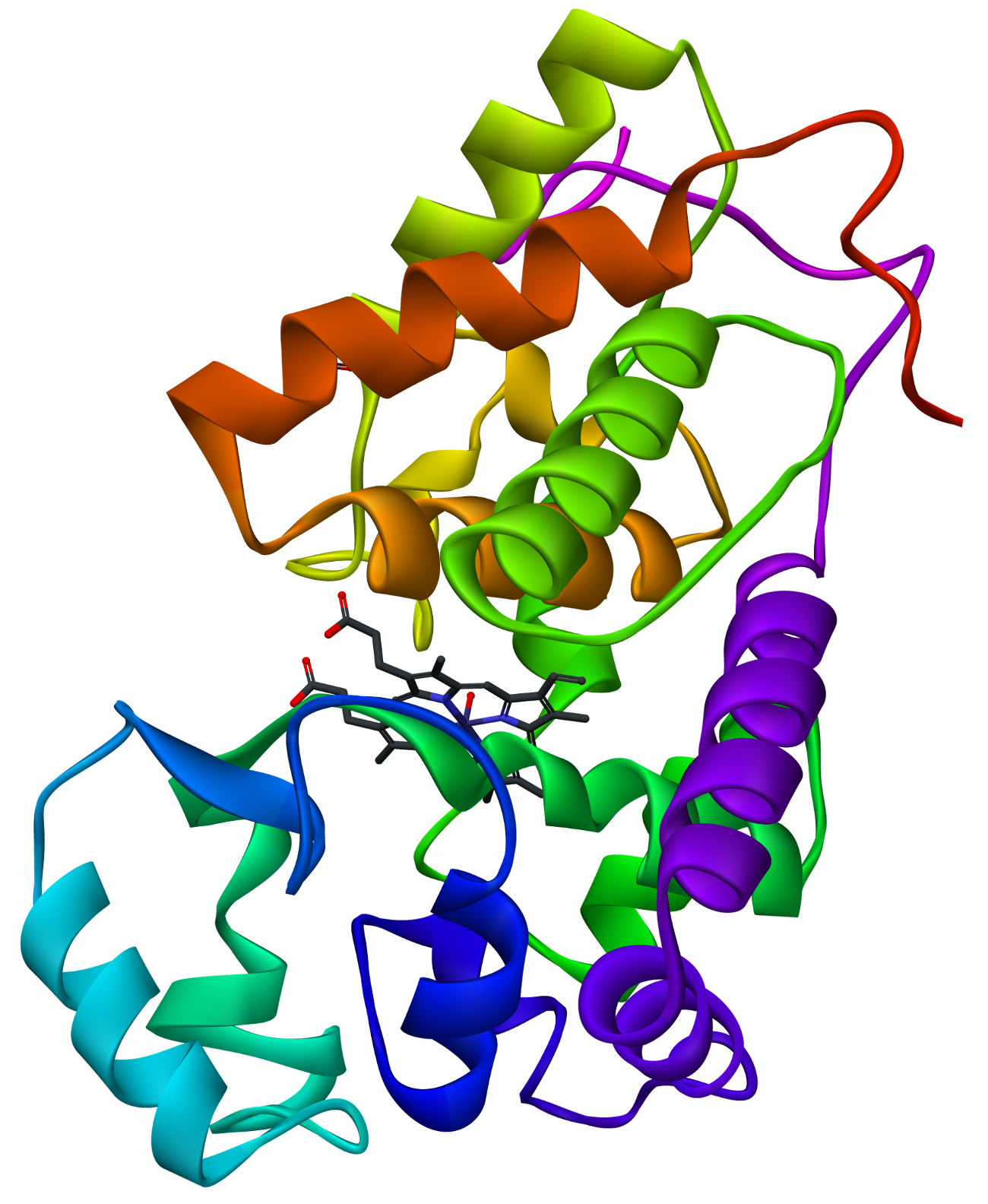
- Horseradish peroxidase C1

Identifiers
- Organism: Armoracia rusticana
- Symbol: Peroxidase C1A
- Alt. symbols: PRXC1A
- Orthologs: OMA: entry
- PDB: 1W4WMore structures
- UniProt: P00433

Other data
- EC number: 1.11.1.7
Search for
- Structures: Swiss-model
- Domains: InterPro

The enzyme horseradish peroxidase (HRP), found in the roots of horseradish, is used extensively in biochemistry applications. It is a metalloenzyme with many isoforms, of which the most studied type is C. It catalyzes the oxidation of various organic substrates by hydrogen peroxide.

== Structure ==
The structure of the enzyme was first solved by X-ray crystallography in 1997 and has since been solved several times with various substrates. It is a large alpha-helical glycoprotein which binds heme as a redox cofactor.

== Substrates ==
Alone, the HRP enzyme, or conjugates thereof, is of little value; its presence must be made visible using a substrate that, when oxidized by HRP using hydrogen peroxide as the oxidizing agent, yields a characteristic color change that is detectable by spectrophotometric methods.

Numerous substrates for horseradish peroxidase have been described and commercialized to exploit the desirable features of HRP. These substrates fall into several distinct categories. HRP catalyzes the conversion of chromogenic substrates (e.g., TMB, DAB, ABTS) into colored products, and produces light when acting on chemiluminescent substrates (e.g. enhanced chemiluminescence by luminol).

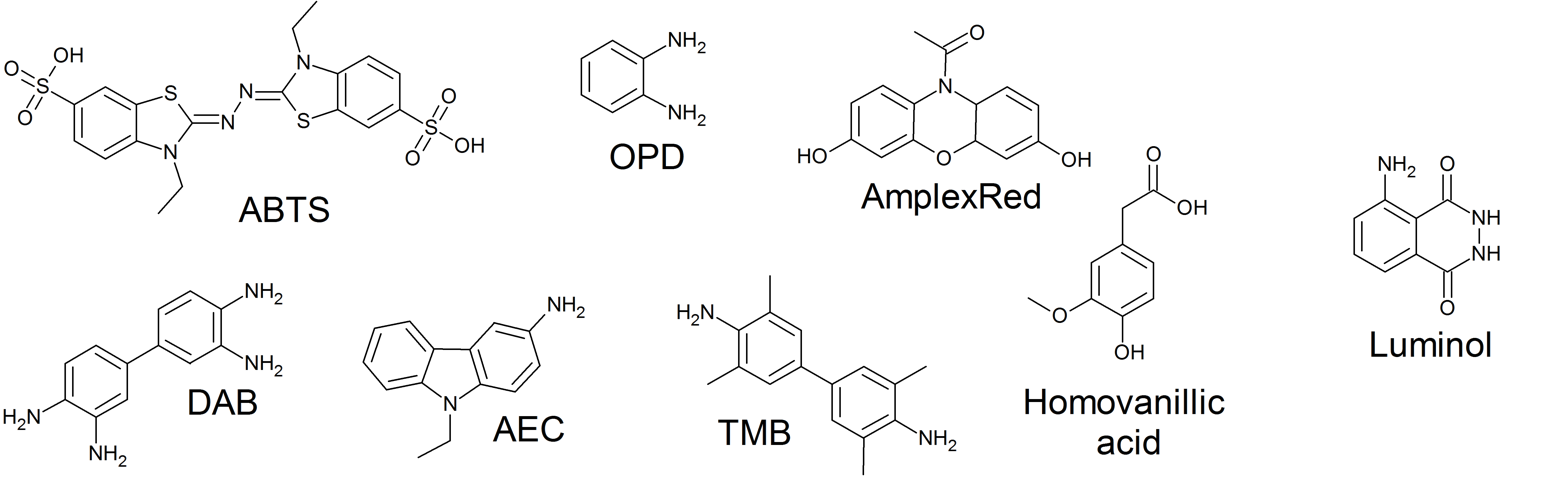
Some of the most common HRP chromogenic substrates. Luminol is the exception, as it is not a chromophore and light is generated after the HRP-catalyzed reaction.

== Applications ==
Horseradish peroxidase is a 44,173.9-dalton glycoprotein with six lysine residues which can be conjugated to a labeled molecule. It produces a coloured, fluorimetric or luminescent derivative of the labeled molecule when incubated with a proper substrate, allowing it to be detected and quantified. HRP is often used in conjugates (molecules that have been joined genetically or chemically) to determine the presence of a molecular target. For example, an antibody conjugated to HRP may be used to detect a small amount of a specific protein in a western blot. Here, the antibody provides the specificity to locate the protein of interest, and the HRP enzyme, in the presence of a substrate, produces a detectable signal. Horseradish peroxidase is also commonly used in techniques such as ELISA and Immunohistochemistry due to its monomeric nature and the ease with which it produces coloured products. Peroxidase, a heme-containing oxidoreductase, is a commercially important enzyme which catalyses the reductive cleavage of hydrogen peroxide by an electron donor.

Horseradish peroxidase is ideal in many respects for these applications because it is smaller, more stable, and less expensive than other popular alternatives such as alkaline phosphatase. It also has a high turnover rate that allows generation of strong signals in a relatively short time span. High concentrations of phosphate severely decrease stability of horseradish peroxidase. In addition to biomedical applications, horseradish peroxidase is one of the enzymes with important environmental applications. This enzyme is suitable for the removal of hydroxylated aromatic compounds (HACs) that are considered to be primary pollutants in a wide variety of industrial wastewater.

Moreover, "In recent years the technique of marking neurons with the enzyme horseradish peroxidase has become a major tool. In its brief history, this method has probably been used by more neurobiologists than have used the Golgi stain since its discovery in 1870."

=== Enhanced chemiluminescence ===
Horseradish peroxidase catalyses the oxidation of luminol to 3-aminophthalate via several intermediates. The reaction is accompanied by emission of low-intensity light at 428 nm (purple in color). In the presence of certain chemicals, the light emitted is enhanced up to 1000-fold, making the light easier to detect and increasing the sensitivity of the reaction. The enhancement of light emission is called enhanced chemiluminescence (ECL). Several enhancers can be used such as the commonly known modified phenols (mainly iodo-phenol). Several substrates on the market use other enhancers which result in luminescence signals up to 13 times greater than phenol-enhanced substrates. The intensity of light is a measure of the number of enzyme molecules reacting and thus of the amount of hybrid. ECL is simple to set up and is sensitive, detecting about 0.5 pg nucleic acid in Southern blots and in northern blots. Detection by chemiluminescent substrates has several advantages over chromogenic substrates. The sensitivity is 10- to 100-fold greater, and quantifying of light emission is possible over a wide dynamic range, whereas that for coloured precipitates is much more limited, about one order of magnitude less. Stripping filters are much easier when chemiluminescent substrates are used.

=== Polymer synthesis ===
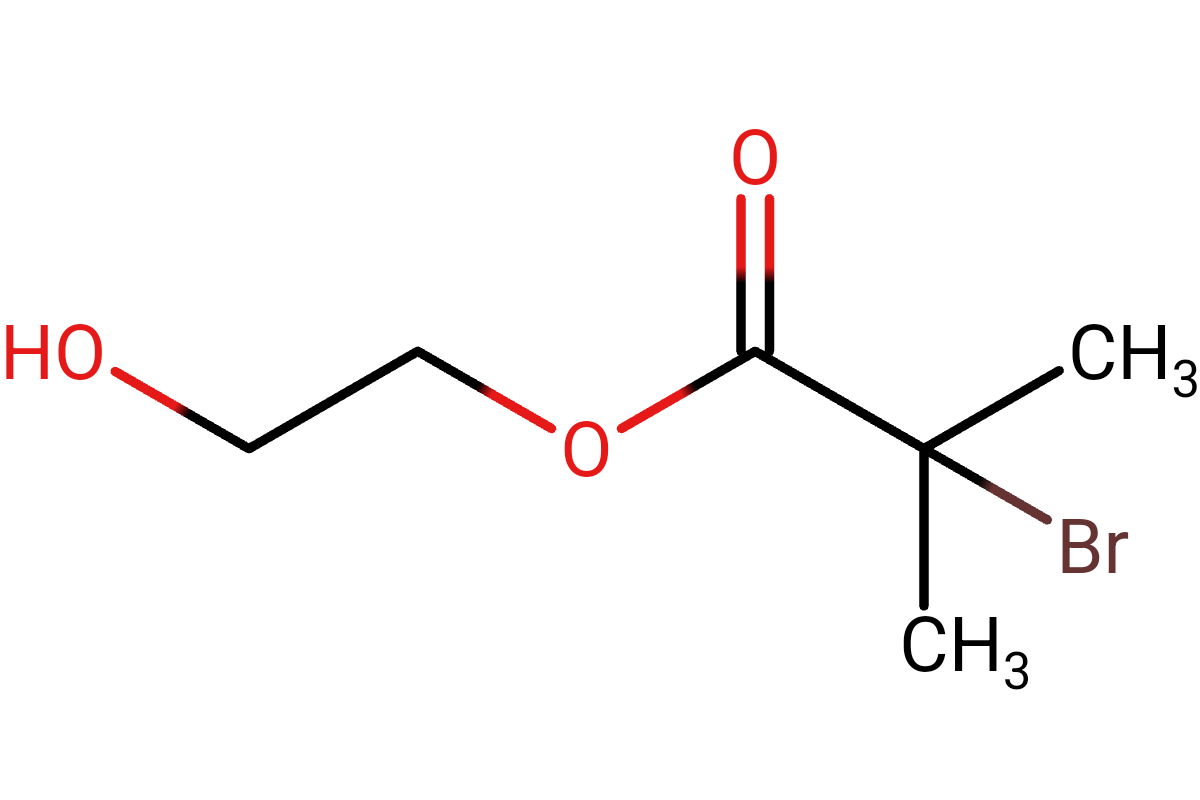
2-Hydroxyethyl 2-bromoisobutyrate, HRP substrate.

Horseradish peroxidase can be used for various polymerization reactions, but the most extensively studied one is a polymerization of phenol derivatives. However, Horseradish peroxidase can also be used as a catalyst for Atom Transfer Radical Polymerization reactions and create polymers in absence of any hydrogen peroxide. In this case, a substrate for HRP is alkyl halide or alkyl nitrile, which are initiators of ATRP reactions. HRP reacts with such compounds, creating radicals, that start polymerization. HRP-catalysed ATRP provides the level of control over polymerization comparable to the one obtained in metal-catalysed reaction.

== HRP mimics ==
Many materials have been explored to mimic natural HRP. For example, iron oxide nanoparticles and hemin-containing complexes have been used to mimic HRP. These HRP-like artificial enzymes have been used for many applications, ranging from biomarker detection and tumor immunostaining to antibiofouling.

== See also ==
- Artificial enzyme
