= Blood residue =

Remnants of blood in forensic science

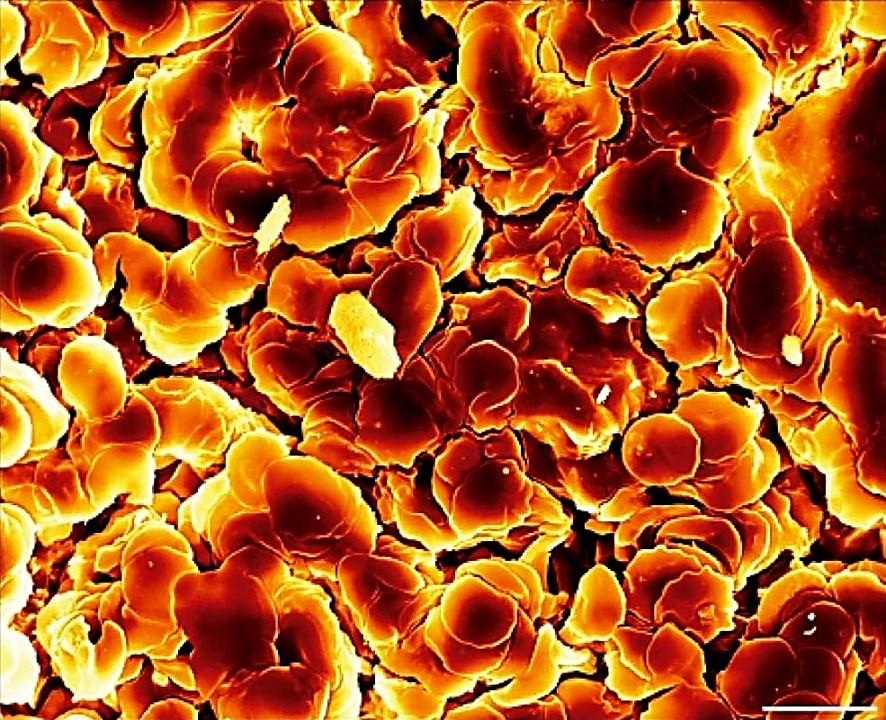
SEM micrograph of a human bloodstain. Pseudo-colored image using software coupled with the microscope, in order to improve the realistic appearance of the stain. The bar corresponds to 10 micrometers.

Blood residue are the wet and dry remnants of blood, as well the discoloration of surfaces on which blood has been shed. In forensic science, blood residue can help investigators identify weapons, reconstruct a criminal action, and link suspects to the crime. In archaeology, it can be used to detect of origin of blood stains on buried objects.

== Forensic significance ==
Blood constitutes about eight percent of a person's weight (normally about five liters), and it circulates near the surface of the skin. Almost all trauma to the body, therefore, results in the shedding of blood. Its red color makes it readily apparent at crime scenes, and its residues are very difficult to completely remove. Blood residue has even been recovered from 100,000-year-old stone tools.

Laboratory testing can reveal whether a substance is indeed blood, whether the blood is of animal or human origin, and the blood group to which it belongs. This allows investigators to include or exclude persons as perpetrators or victims. The antigens that allow blood group testing, however, deteriorate with age or improper storage. The DNA contained in blood, on the other hand, is less subject to deterioration, and allows near-certain matching of blood residue to individuals with DNA profiling techniques. Through bloodstain pattern analysis, information about events can also be gained from the spatial distribution of bloodstains.

== Forensic procedure ==
=== Finding and documenting blood residue ===
Freshly dried bloodstains are a glossy reddish-brown in color. Under the influence of sunlight, the weather or removal attempts, the color eventually disappears and the stain turns grey. The surface on which it is found may also influence the stain's color.

Crime scenes are normally carefully searched for blood residue. Flashlights held at an angle to the surfaces under examination assist in this, as do luminol sprays which can detect even trace amounts of blood. Presumptive tests exist with which blood can be distinguished from other reddish stains, such as of ketchup or rust, found at the scene. The search includes areas beyond the immediate crime scene where blood might have been wiped off or bloody fingerprints left, such as towels or doorknobs. At outdoor crime scenes, bloodstains may be recovered from the ground or from plant surfaces.

The standard documentation of blood residue includes photographs and descriptions of form, color, size and position of each stain found. Overall photographs and sketches are also produced to show the relationship of the blood residue to other elements of the scene and to enable pattern analysis. Recently 3D imaging techniques have been tried for documenting and investigating bloodstains.

=== Collection and preservation ===
To collect samples for analysis, wet blood is collected with a syringe and stored in a tube with anticoagulant, or collected with absorbent fabric that is allowed to air-dry. Dried blood is scraped off with a blade, or collected with a moistened cotton-tipped applicator, a gel lifter or fingerprint tape. Bloodstained clothing and other items are generally wrapped in paper and shipped whole to the laboratory. To prevent deterioration, blood residue samples are stored under refrigeration and, in the case of stains, air-dried.

== Archaeology ==
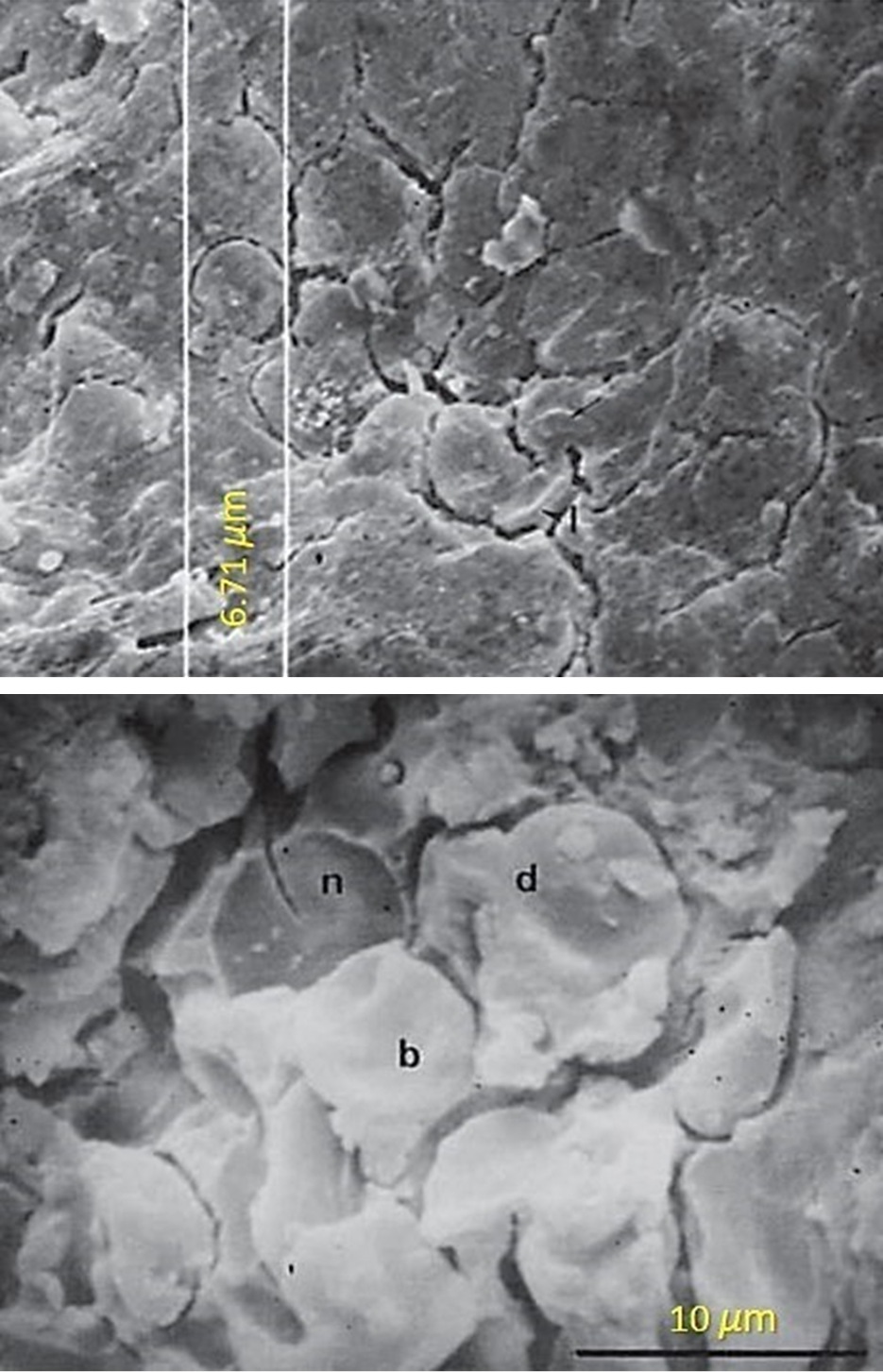
SEM micrographs of a collared peccary experimental bloodstain on chert, aged for one year. Top: a hecatocyte, an erythrocyte with a moon-like shape where plasma, upon drying, contracts and delineates the cell; bottom: a janocyte (n), a negative replica of an erythrocyte, where the dried plasma retains the shape of the red blood cell after it has been displaced or degraded.

Analysis of blood residue is also an important technique in archaeology, where this field is sometimes referred to as haemotaphonomy (etymologically coming from the Greek haima for blood, taphos for burial, and nomos for law). It particularly involves studies of the morphology of blood cells in bloodstains deposited on different substrates.It should not be confused with bloodstain pattern analysis.

Haemotaphonomy has also been used to study blood residues on fragments of medieval manuscripts, and on the Shroud of Turin.

The term haemotaphonomy was proposed in 1992. It was inspired by the word "taphonomy" introduced in palaeontology in 1940 by Ivan Yefremov. The focus of haemotaphonomy is the morphology of blood cells when blood is in the form of a stain. Therefore, its subjects of study are any specimens stained with blood. The study method of haemotaphonomy is the analysis of images obtained through a scanning electron microscope (SEM). However, confocal microscopy is a practical alternative to an SEM when a very high level of detail of the bloodstain surface is not required.

== See also ==
- Bloodstain pattern analysis
