= Lyoluminescence =

Emission of light while dissolving a solid into a liquid solvent

Lyoluminescence refers to the emission of light while dissolving a solid into a liquid solvent. It is a form of chemiluminescence. The most common lyoluminescent effect is seen when solid samples which have been heavily irradiated by ionizing radiation are dissolved in water. The total amount of light emitted by the material increases proportionally with the total radiation dose received by the material up to a certain level called the saturation value.

Many gamma-irradiated substances are known to produce lyoluminescence; these include spices, powdered milk, soups, cotton, and paper. While the broad variety of materials which exhibit lyoluminescence confounds explanation by a single common mechanism, there is a common feature to the phenomenon, the production of free radicals in solution. Lyoluminescence intensity can be increased by performing the dissolution of the solid in a solution containing conventionally chemiluminescent compounds, such as luminol. These are thus called lyoluminescence sensitizers.
