= Bloodstain pattern analysis =

Forensic method

Examples of blood-spatter and droplet patterns

Bloodstain pattern analysis (BPA) is a forensic discipline focused on analyzing bloodstains left at known, or suspected crime scenes through visual pattern recognition and physics-based assessments. This is done with the purpose of drawing inferences about the nature, timing and other details of the crime. At its core, BPA revolves around recognizing and categorizing bloodstain patterns, a task essential for reconstructing events in crimes or accidents, verifying statements made during investigations, resolving uncertainties about involvement in a crime, identifying areas with a high likelihood of offender movement for prioritized DNA sampling, and discerning between homicides, suicides, and accidents. Not to be confused with haemotaphonomy.

Since the late 1950s, BPA experts have claimed to be able to use biology, physics, and mathematical calculations to reconstruct with accuracy events at a crime scene, and these claims have been accepted by the criminal justice system in the US. Bloodstain pattern analysts use a variety of different classification methods. The most common classification method was created by S. James, P. Kish, and P. Sutton, and it divides bloodstains into three categories: passive, spatter, and altered.

Despite its importance, classifying bloodstain patterns poses challenges due to the absence of a universally accepted methodology and the natural uncertainty in interpreting such patterns. Current classification methods often describe pattern types based on their formation mechanisms rather than observable characteristics, complicating the analysis process. Ideally, BPA involves meticulous evaluation of pattern characteristics against objective criteria, followed by interpretation to aid crime scene reconstruction. However, the lack of discipline standards in methodology underscores the need for consistency and rigor in BPA practices.

The validity of bloodstain pattern analysis has been questioned since the 1990s, and more recent studies cast significant doubt on its accuracy. A comprehensive 2009 National Academy of Sciences report concluded that "the uncertainties associated with bloodstain pattern analysis are enormous" and that purported bloodstain pattern experts' opinions are "more subjective than scientific". The report highlighted several incidents of blood spatter analysts overstating their qualifications and questioned the reliability of their methods. In 2021, the largest-to-date study on the accuracy of BPA was published, with results "show[ing] that [BPA conclusions] were often erroneous and often contradicted other analysts."

== History ==
=== Early history ===
Bloodstain pattern analysis has been used informally for centuries, but the first modern study of blood stains was in 1895. Dr. Eduard Piotrowski of the University of Kraków published a paper titled "On the formation, form, direction, and spreading of blood stains after blunt trauma to the head." He conducted his first experiments on rabbits. A number of publications describing various aspects of blood stains were published, but his publication did not lead to a systematic analysis. LeMoyne Snyder's widely used book Homicide Investigation (first published in 1941 and updated occasionally through at least the 1970s) also briefly mentioned details that later bloodstain experts would expand upon (e.g., that blood dries at a relatively predictable rate; that arterial blood is a brighter red color than other blood; that bloodstains tend to fall in certain patterns based on the motion of an attacker and victim). A 1952 episode of the police procedural radio series Dragnet made reference to bloodstain pattern analysis to reconstruct a shooting incident.

=== Acceptance as valid evidence in United States courts ===
Between 1880 and 1957, courts in Michigan, Mississippi, Ohio, and California rejected expert testimony for bloodspatter analysis, generally holding that it added nothing to the jurors' own evaluations of bloodstains submitted as evidence. In 1957, the California Supreme Court became the first American court to accept expert testimony examining bloodstains, accepting as evidence the testimony of Paul L. Kirk, a professor of biochemistry and criminalistics. He would also testify in the Sam Sheppard case in 1966, when the wife of an osteopathic physician was beaten to death in her home, interpreting bloodspatter evidence as proof that the murderer was left-handed (Sheppard was right-handed). However, bloodstain pattern analysis would not begin to enter wide use until it was promoted by Herbert Leon MacDonell. MacDonell researched bloodstains with a grant from the United States Department of Justice, and which also published his research in the book "Flight Characteristics and Stain Patterns of Human Blood" (1971). The basis for MacDonell's alleged expertise was a set of experiments he conducted by extracting his own blood and then slinging it around in the basement of his house in Corning, New York. MacDonell testified in court on multiple occasions as an expert of bloodstain analysis, and the legal precedent set by these cases led to its widespread use in American courts, although as early as 1980 some judges expressed strong doubts about its reliability, and it was not always accepted as evidence, especially in states with no prior rulings that relied on such evidence.

The first formal bloodstain training course was given by MacDonell in 1973 in Jackson, Mississippi. MacDonell taught workshops on how to conduct bloodstain analysis, and the newly trained bloodstain analysts, who often had received as little as 40 hours of instruction, in turn would give expert testimony in court cases. In 1983, the International Association of Bloodstain Pattern Analysts was founded by a group of blood stain analysts to help develop the emerging field of bloodstain pattern analysis.

==== Further investigation into its admissibility as evidence ====
Starting in 1995, court cases where bloodstain analysts disagreed with each other raised concerns of the discipline's prediction's admissibility as evidence in court. In 2009, the National Academy of Sciences published an examination of forensic methods used in United States courts which harshly criticized both bloodstain pattern analysis and the credentials of the majority of the analysts and experts in the field. Judges have largely ignored the report's findings and continue to accept bloodstain pattern analysis as expert evidence.

In 2013 Daniel Attinger, a fluid dynamics researcher at Columbia University, published a paper on bloodstain pattern analysis in Forensic Science International, finding that many of the central hypotheses of bloodstain analysis remain untested, and that existing analysts often made incorrect assumptions or other errors in their analyses. The paper also proposed fluid dynamics as a theoretical framework for solving these problems, and Attinger has continued to publish several papers exploring these concepts (as have other scientists as well). However, these papers are largely theoretical, and have had little impact on the use of bloodstain analysis in courts.

== The physics of blood ==
=== Principles ===
Blood is composed of three components suspended in plasma: erythrocytes (red blood cells), leukocytes (white blood cells), and thrombocytes (platelets).

When a blood vessel is damaged, the blood starts moving outside the circulatory system. If this leaking blood reaches the surface of the skin, it will be externalized and may come into contact with the person's surroundings. Some of the most common interactions are:

- Gravity
- An internal source applying pressure on the blood (expiration, blood pressure, etc.)
- External force applied at the source of the bleeding (e.g., being hit with a weapon)
- Transfer or alteration resulting from two surfaces coming into contact (swipe, wipe, etc.)

Since blood is 55% plasma (and 45% solid components suspended in plasma), it is an aqueous liquid and behaves as such. More specifically, it is a shear-thinning, non-Newtonian fluid, which has the following behavior with respect to three properties of liquids:

- Viscosity (denoted by μ) describes the relation between force applied on the fluid and the rate at which the fluid particles can be separated from each other, or deformed. If a fluid has a high viscosity, it will not flow as easily as a fluid with a lower viscosity. Because this relates directly to the strength of the attraction between the fluid molecules, viscosity of blood decreases with increasing temperature and decreasing hematocrit. It also lowers with a higher shear, which is why it is classified as a shear-thinning, non-Newtonian fluid. This is why blood appears more watery when it hits a surface than right after it leaves the body. The closer the shear rate is to zero, the more viscous the blood is. Some other factors can also influence blood viscosity.
- Surface tension (denoted by σ ) describes the energy required to change the shape of a fluid when it comes into contact with another fluid in which it is not miscible (e.g., blood and air). This plays a big role in the formation of spherical blood droplets as they fall, as well as the way they react when they hit a surface. Surface tension can also be affected by outside factors such as temperature and the presence of chemicals in the blood.
- Density (denoted by d) represents a fluid's mass per unit volume, which allows for comparison between substances. The reference for comparison is usually water since it has a density of 1 g/cm^{3}.

== Bloodstain types ==
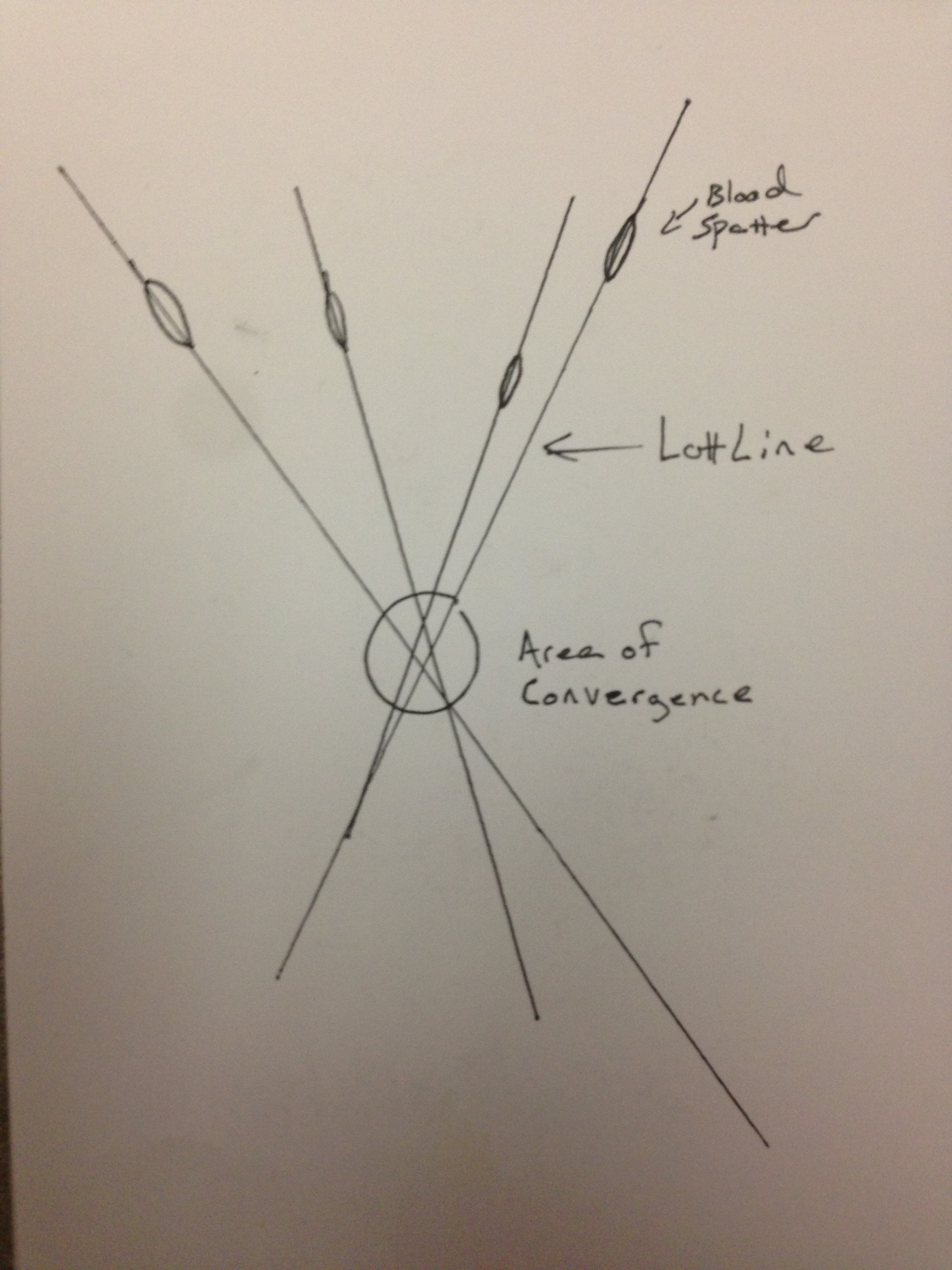
Shows how to determine area of convergence from blunt trauma blood spatter.

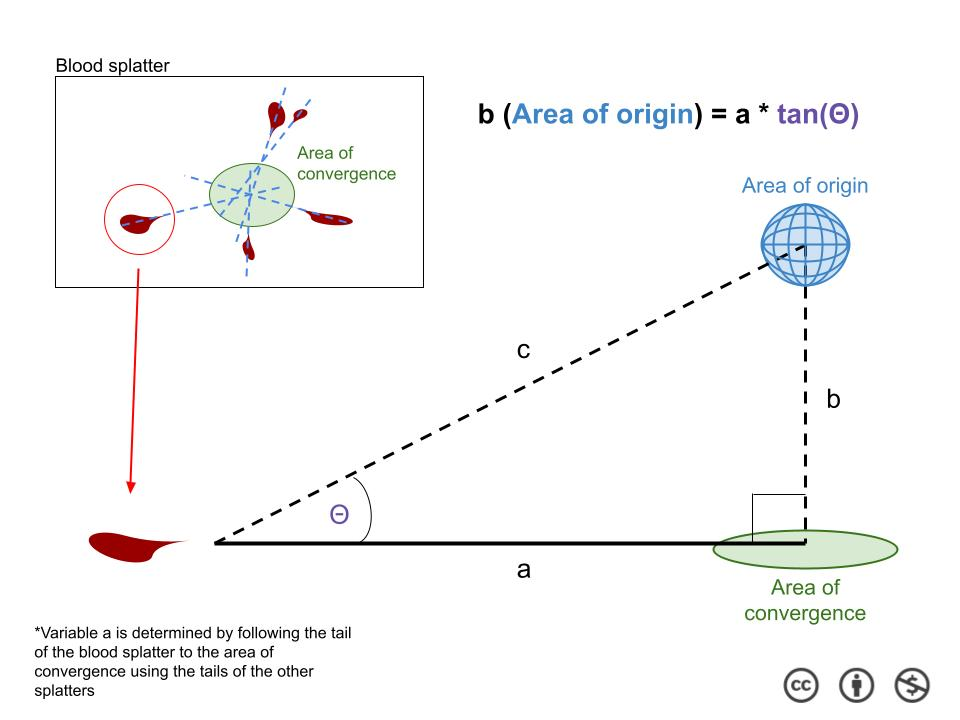
Diagram showing how to calculate the area of origin of a blood spatter

A bloodstain can present itself differently depending on the situation and the material on which it appears, and bloodstains may be hard to examine on porous surfaces such as fabric, and may be distorted. These variations are largely influenced by the surface, or substrate on which the blood is deposited. Surface properties such as porosity, texture, and absorbency play a significant role in determining the size, shape, and overall morphology of bloodstains. On smooth, non-porous surfaces, blood droplets tend to retain a more circular shape with well defined edges due to surface tension resisting disruption upon impact. In contrast, rough or porous surfaces, including fabrics, can disrupt the surface tension of the droplet and absorb blood into the material, resulting in distortion, irregular shapes, and the formation of spines or satellite stains. The degree of distortion is more influenced by the texture of the target surface rather than the distance the droplet has fallen, and absorbent materials may also reduce the visibility of directional features, complicating interpretation. Additionally, surface characteristics such as weave, roughness and absorbency can affect the apparent size and distribution of stains, with bloodstains often appearing larger and less defined on absorbent materials compared to smooth, non-porous surfaces. These substrate related effects can complicate the interpretation of bloodstain patterns and may influence the accuracy of reconstruction events such as the angle of impact or the area of origin.

Bloodstain pattern analysts consider the angle of impact to determine its origin and the amount of force behind it; variations in external forces can cause satellite drops. A point of origin can be determined by finding what bloodstain analysts call the "area of convergence" for the blood droplets. To find this point of origin, the shape of the blood and the length are often taken into account and the stringing method is implemented. In the stringing method, blood drop paths are depicted as straight lines. Strings are placed at the bloodstain positions and pulled away from the surface to reconstruct the direction of impact. This direction is determined by the shape and orientation of the bloodstains. The point where most strings intersect is considered the estimated location of the blood source. There is also a method known as the tangent method. In this method, the blood drops' paths are seen as right-angled triangle hypotenuses. This works best for fast-moving drops with flat trajectories, but uncertainties in their curvature may lead to errors in determining the blood source's horizontal position."

Additionally, the angle of impact as well as other external factors such as the material on which the blood falls can change the shape and size of the blood. The point of impact can change the shape of the bloodstain. Bloodstains, instead of maintaining their original forms, may become elongated. In these cases, the blood may have a tail capable of indicating directionality. In order to find the angle of impact investigators measure the length and width of the blood droplet and use the formula $sin(A)=width/length$. The (A) representing angle of impact.

Three-dimensional modeling, animation, and laser scanning are increasingly used to reconstruct bloodstain arrangements within a crime scene. These digital methods allow analysts to see how the events possibly occurred by producing simulations based on laser scans of the scene, including the replication of bloodstain patterns and the positions and movements of individuals during bloodshed. In some cases, these simulations have been used to clarify events and assisted in advancing criminal investigations.

=== Passive stains ===
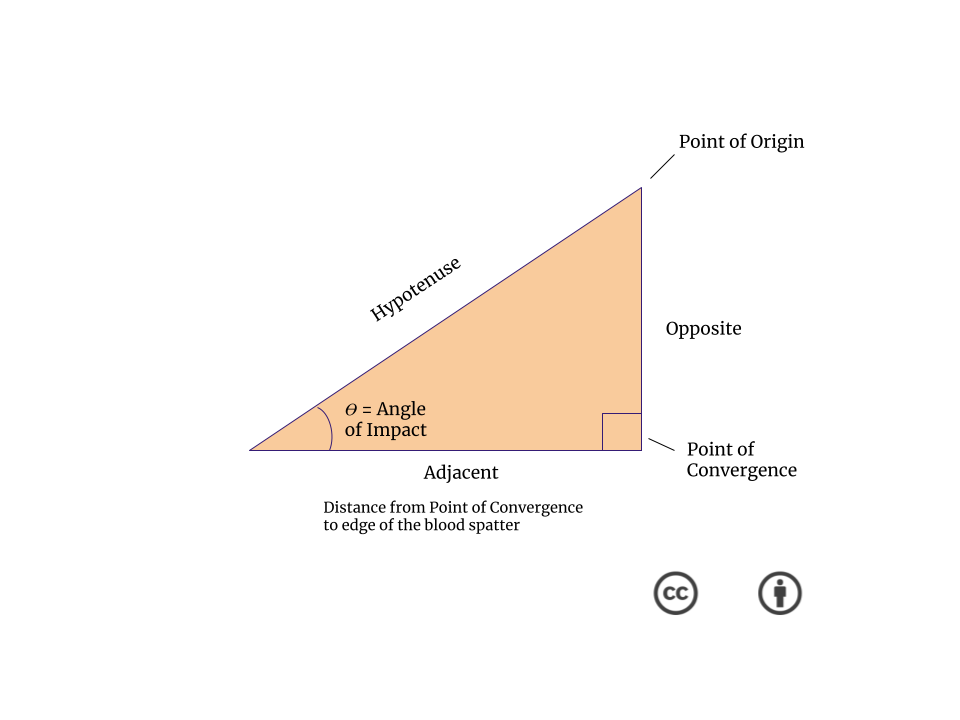
How to calculate the point of origin of a blood spatter

Passive or gravity bloodstains (bloodstain patterns that are formed under the influence of gravity) are separated further into four categories: transfer/contact stains, flow artefacts, drop stains, and pooling. Transfer stains occur when two surfaces come into contact and at least one is wet with blood, and it includes swipe and wipe patterns, which can give information regarding sequence of movement in some cases. Wipe patterns occur when a surface with blood is disturbed, where as a swipe pattern is when blood is deposited on a non-bloodied surface. Movement can be determined by feathering and a diminished volume of blood. Flow artefacts arise from when a volume of blood is deposited on an angled or vertical surface. These flow patterns form when a volume of blood moves from one area to another. This can occur due to gravity or the contour and shape of a surface or victim. Drop stains, when travelling through the air, keep shape due to surface tension until they reach their destination. The drop shape is indicative of the angle of impact as stated above. Pooling occurs when the source of the bleeding remains static for a certain period of time, the blood continuously dripping in the same location and resulting in an important accumulation. This may cause satellites, resulting in secondary mechanism spatter. This secondary mechanism spatter is produced when drops of blood land in pools of blood, splashing the area surrounding the pool. If the individual who is actively bleeding moves while blood is dripping, the resulting pattern will allow for determination of direction and relative speed of movement at that time.

=== Impact spatter stains ===
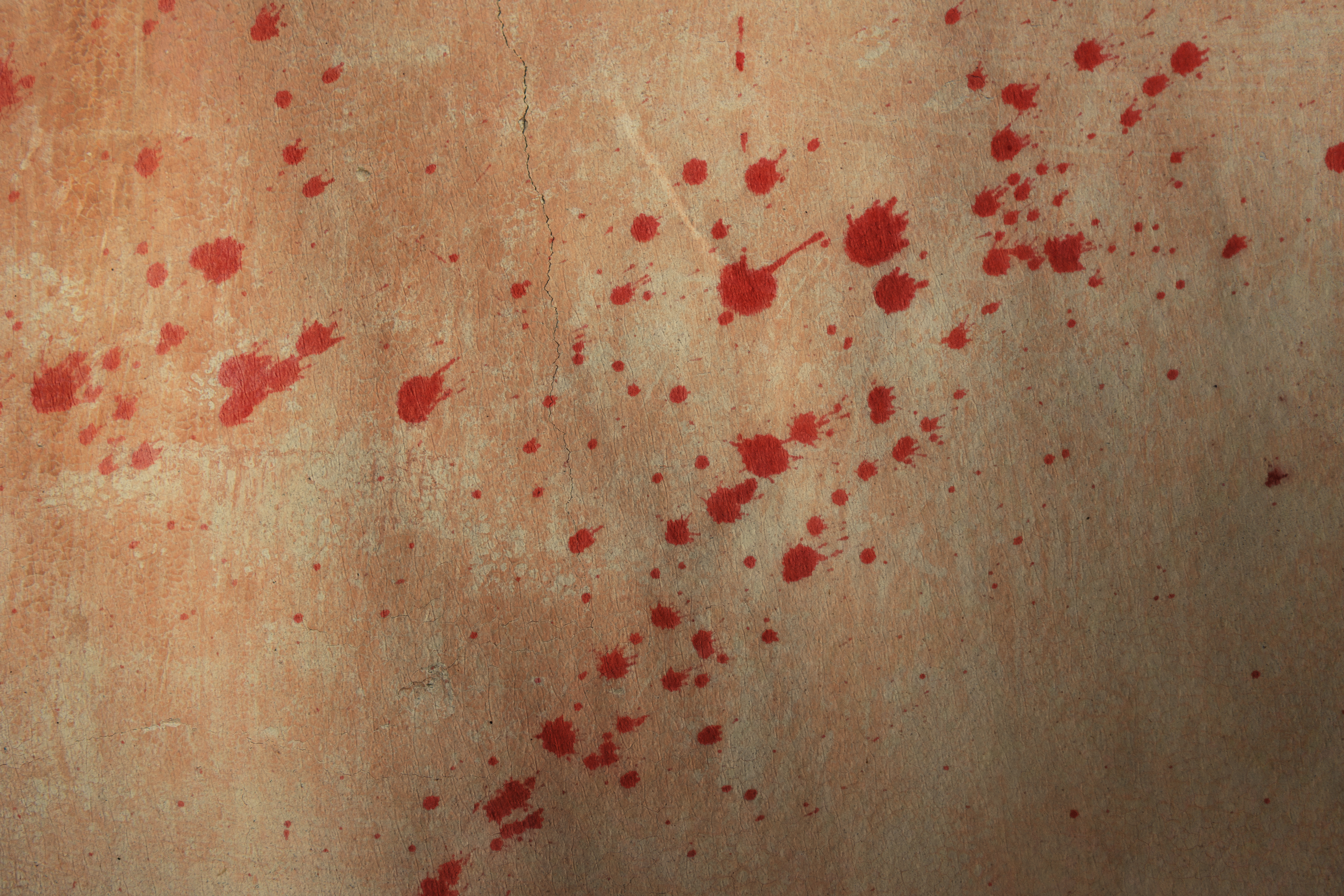
Cast-off blood stain pattern

Impact spatter is the most common bloodstain pattern type in a crime scene. It occurs when an object hits a source of blood. In impact blood spatter patterns, blood is often circular and not elongated. There are two types of impact spatter, back spatter and forward spatter. Back spatter occurs when blood is projected back at an attacker, while forward spatter is blood that exits directly from the victim's wound and projects onto nearby surfaces. The speed of the weapon used in the attack can cause changes in the size of blood spatter. The speed of the attack is classified into high, medium and low velocity attacks. High-velocity spatter (e.g., gunshot wounds) create small-sized droplets. High-velocity spatter usually travels 100 feet per second and creates blood droplets sized 1 millimeter or less. Medium-velocity spatter (e.g., blunt force trauma) is often made with a weapon and can create cast-off patterns. They are often made at between 5 and 25 feet/second the blood droplets ranging from 1 to 4 millimeters in length. Low-velocity spatters are usually created just as a result of blood dripping from the individual (i.e., gravity). Cast-off patterns are associated with impact spatter. These patterns arise from blood being ejected from a bloodied or bleeding object during its movement, commonly observed in incidents involving physical assaults or strikes. They are commonly observed on ceilings when objects are swung overhead, although they can potentially appear on any surface within the surrounding area. These patterns may be used to guess the direction of a weapon swing. In these cases, the length and the shape of the bloodstain patterns can help determine the speed of the swing. These patterns create elongated or elliptical shapes in blood when it hits the surface of an object. In 1895, Dr. Eduard Piotrowski's experiment showed that these patterns are often created after the second hit using the weapon.

=== Altered stains ===
As defined in S. James, P. Kish, and P. Sutton, any bloodstain can be subjected to physical or chemical changes that can alter the appearance of the stain. These can be changes like the aging, drying, clotting, the attempted removal or cleaning of a blood stain and the lack of a stain due to the interference of an object, known as void stain patterns. Aging and drying occur will occur at the same time, with cracks in the blood droplets forming from the drying process and the darkening of the stain as it ages. The stain goes from a red to a dark red/brown as oxygen leaves the oxyhemoglobin in the red blood cells. As bloodstains dry, the hematocrit evaporates, affecting the density of the blood droplet which has an effect on the surface tension. Clotting is caused by the fibrinogen platelets in the blood and a useful indicator of the passing of time at a scene. In a scenario where there are multiple stains, clotting will help establish a timeline of when bloodletting occurred at a scene. This includes postmortem wounds. Stains with a smaller volume of blood may dry before the blood is given the opportunity to clot. Cleaning is often an attempt to hide or remove the stain itself with any number of detergents or bleach, but luminol is utilized to reveal the trace quantities of blood left over or missed. In some cases, void or shadow patterns can be observed. It is the result of a person or an object shielding an area from the blood coming toward it, and it is characterized by a clean area where blood stains are expected. It can help determine if whatever intercepted the blood has been moved since the incident occurred.

== Research and reliability ==
The reliability of courtroom testimony by bloodstain pattern analysts has come under fire, particularly in the wake of a 2009 report by the National Academy of Sciences, which found the method of analysis to be "subjective rather than scientific", and that it involved an "enormous" degree of uncertainty. In addition to concerns over methodology, the report criticized the lack of proper certification requirements for analysts and an emphasis on "experience over scientific foundations". Many bloodstain pattern analysts have testified in court as experts despite having received training only in the form of a 40-hour course taught independently by MacDonell or one of his students, without institutional accreditation or minimum educational requirements. Even with proper training and methods, there are still many times where reputable analysts disagree on their findings, which calls into question the reliability of their conclusions and its value as evidence in court.

There is very little empirical evidence to support the use of blood spatter analysis in court or any other aspect of the legal system. While certain aspects of bloodstain pattern analysis, such as methods for determining the impact speeds of spattered blood, are supported by scientific studies, some analysts go well beyond what is verifiable. In addition to problems with the underlying scientific validity of the method, the circumstances of bloodstain pattern analyses, which are often conducted at the behest of either the prosecution or the defense in a court case, can introduce confirmation bias into the analyst's assessment.

In 2016, the Texas Forensic Science Commission reviewed cases that had used bloodstain pattern analysis, and consequently established that starting in 2019, bloodstain pattern analysts will need accreditation to testify as experts in Texas courts.

In 2021, the largest study to date on the accuracy of bloodstain pattern analysis was published in Forensic Science International. The study was based on 33,005 multiple-choice responses and 1760 short text responses, by 75 practicing bloodstain pattern analysts on 192 bloodstain patterns selected to be representative of casework, and stated:

Our results show that conclusions were often erroneous and often contradicted other analysts. On samples with known causes, 11.2% of responses were erroneous. The results show limited reproducibility of conclusions: 7.8% of responses contradicted other analysts. The disagreements with respect to the meaning and usage of BPA terminology and classifications suggest a need for improved standards. Both semantic differences and contradictory interpretations contributed to errors and disagreements, which could have serious implications if they occurred in casework.

=== Relevant case histories ===
A number of court cases are controversial due to their reliance on bloodstain pattern analysis:

==== Warren Horinek ====
In 1996, Warren Horinek was convicted of murdering his wife in Fort Worth, Texas based largely on bloodstain evidence that has since been disputed. The police and the district attorney's office believed in Horinek's innocence. The appointed attorneys for the prosecution found a bloodstain pattern analyst who testified that, rather than being a suicide as believed for a number of reasons by police, it was a murder due to the pattern of small blood flecks found on the accused, which according to the analyst had to have come from "high velocity" blood from a gunshot, rather than blood that simply got on him through his attempts to provide medical aid to the victim. Other bloodstain pattern analysts have since disputed this claim and said that the bloodstains were consistent with medical aid. The original analyst has conceded that his claim is not as strong as he originally presented it as being, although he still believes in Horinek's guilt. As of 2025, Horinek remains in prison.

==== David Camm ====
In the criminal case against David Camm, who was tried three times in Indiana for the murder of his family largely on the basis of blood spatter evidence, both prosecution and the defense used expert bloodstain pattern analysts to interpret the source of the approximately 8 drops of blood on his shirt. The prosecution's experts included Tom Bevel and Rod Englert, who testified that the stains were high-velocity impact spatter. Five witnesses testified for the defense that the stains were transferred from his shirt brushing against his daughter's hair. Dr. Robert Shaler, Founding Director of the Penn State Forensic Science Program, decried blood spatter analysis as unreliable in the Camm case. "The problem, in this case, is the number of stains [ is ] minimal," he said. "I think you're really on the edge of reliability." All of the blood spatter analysts involved in the case are "experts" in the traditional sense. Quoting Shaler, "We have two opinions in this case. That, in essence, is a 50 percent error rate. " This would be an unacceptable level of reliability in a court case given that the perception of guilt beyond a reasonable doubt is what is required.

Further complicating matters was the testimony of Rob Stites, who testified for the prosecution as an expert blood spatter analyst. It was later uncovered that he had no training and his credentials were fabrications by the prosecutor. His testimony that the blood on Camm's shirt was high-velocity impact spatter aided in the conviction of David Camm. Dr. Shaler pointed out that one limitation of blood spatter analysis testimony is that "you do not have the supporting underlying science" to back up your conclusions. When Stites testified, the jury had no way of knowing that he was not the expert that he purported to be. Even among the expert witnesses, it is unknown which set of experts interpreted the stains accurately as there is no objective way of determining which bloodstain pattern analyst has applied the science correctly.

==== Travis Stay ====
Other times, bloodstain patterns from different causes can mimic each other. In the 2008 North Dakota trial of Travis Stay for the murder of Joel Lovelien, prosecution witness Terry Laber testified that the blood spatter on Stay's clothing came from blows to Lovelien during a fist fight. After a review of the evidence by Paul Kish, another bloodstain pattern analyst, Laber reviewed the report submitted by Kish and revised his findings to include the possibility that the blood came from expiration by Lovelien.

== In popular culture ==
- Sam Tyler, the time-travelling detective in episode 3 of the BBC TV series Life on Mars, asks his colleague Chris Skelton to make a blood pattern analysis, quickly realizing by his puzzled expression that in 1973 such techniques are not known.
- Serial killer Dexter Morgan of the Dexter novels and Showtime series is a blood spatter analyst for the fictitious Miami Metro Police Department.
- Catherine Willows and Julie Finlay are blood spatter analysts on the CBS series CSI: Crime Scene Investigation.

== Additional sources ==
- Bevel, Tom; Gardner, Ross M. Bloodstain Pattern Analysis With an Introduction to Crimescene Reconstruction, 3rd Ed. CRC Press 2008
- James, Stuart H.; Kish, Paul Erwin; Sutton, T. Paulette (2005). Principles of Bloodstain Pattern Analysis (3rd, illustrated, revised ed.). Taylor and Francis/CRC Press. ISBN 0-8493-2014-3.
- Hueske, Edward E., Shooting Incident Investigation/Reconstruction Training Manual, 2002
- Bremmer et al., Biphasic Oxidation of Oxyhemoglobin in Bloodstains. PLoS ONE 2011.
- James, Stuart H.; Eckert, William G. Interpretation of Bloodstain Evidence at Crime Scenes, 2nd Edition, CRC Press 1999.
- Neitzel, G. Paul; Smith, Marc. The Fluid Dynamics of Droplet Impact on Inclined Surfaces with Application to Forensic Blood Spatter Analysis. Washington, DC: Office of Justice Programs, 2017.
- Solomon, Berg, Martin, & Villee. Biology, 3rd edition. Saunders College Publishing, Fort Worth, 1993.
- Sutton, Paulette T., Bloodstain Pattern Interpretation, Short Course Manual, University of Tennessee, Memphis TN 1998
- Vennard, John King. Elementary fluid mechanics. John Wiley & Sons, New York, 1982.
