= International Association of Bloodstain Pattern Analysts =

Professional organization

- Abbreviation: IABPA
- Formation: November 18, 1983
- Founder: Herbert MacDonell
- Founded at: Corning, New York, United States
- Region served: International (divided into 6 regions)
- Key people: Herbert MacDonell (founder
- Main organ: Executive Board
- Publication: IABPA Newsletter (quarterly)

The International Association of Bloodstain Pattern Analysts (IABPA) was formed as a professional organization on November 18, 1983 at the Hilton Hotel in Corning, NY under the guidance of Herbert MacDonell. A group of bloodstain analysts recognized the need for a coordinated effort to develop themselves and the emerging field of bloodstain pattern analysis. Of the 23 people present at the meeting moderated by Deborah J. Wakida, 22 became Charter Members. Only Douglas Ridolfi of the Los Angeles County Sheriff's Department declined to join.

In the early 1980s Bloodstain Pattern Analysis (BPA) was beginning to make its way into the investigative toolbox of many North American forensic sections. As any new method of gathering and interpreting forensic evidence, there was some apprehension in many areas of the legal system. When the IABPA bylaws were formed, one of the main objectives of the association was identified as promoting the education of all involved with bloodstain pattern analysis. This was to be done through study, research, and experimentation. There was also an identified need for standardization in the areas of training, analysis, terminology, and reporting.

The IABPA meets annually in October, moving the location between Regions I to IV (see below).

== Membership ==
There are four levels of membership within the IABPA.

- Associate Member - a member who has not completed the 40-hour Bloodstain Pattern Analysis Course but has a general interest in the IABPA

- Provisional Member - a member who has completed the 40-hour Bloodstain Pattern Analysis Course and has been recommended by a Full Member

- Full Member - a Provisional Member may be promoted to Full Member after one year and having been recommended based on efforts in the field of bloodstain analysis study

- Distinguished Member - a member may be granted distinguished status by his peers for significant service to the discipline or the IABPA

(Members receive the IABPA Newsletter, published quarterly.)

== Regions ==
- Region I - Pacific time zone
- Region II - Mountain time zone
- Region III - Central time zone
- Region IV - Eastern time zone
- Region V - Europe and UK
- Region VI - Asean and South Pacific

== Executive board ==
The Executive Board of the IABPA consists of annually elected full members. The positions on the Board include:

- President
- Vice-President, Region I
- Vice-President, Region II
- Vice-President, Region III
- Vice-President, Region IV
- Vice-President, Region V
- Vice-President, Region VI
- Secretary/Treasurer
- Sergeant At Arms
- Historian
- Webmaster

== Charter members ==
The charter members (and their 1983 affiliation) of the IABPA were:

- Tom Bevel (Oklahoma Police Department)
- Joseph Dean (Sacramento County Sheriff's Department)
- Charles Edel (Broward County Sheriff's Office)
- Rod Englert (Multnomah County Sheriff's Office)
- Robert Fitzer (San Francisco Police Department)
- Harry Holmes (Virginia beach Police Department)
- Stuart H. James (Independent Forensic Consultant)
- Michael L. Johnson (Ada County Coroner)
- Samuel Johnson (District 21 Medical Examiner's Office)
- Ronald Linhart (Los Angeles Medical Examiner/Coroner)
- Herbert Leon MacDonell (Laboratory of Forensic Science)
- Sara Lea Moore (Laboratory of Forensic Science)
- Robert W. Przygoda (Schuyler County Sheriff's Department)
- Daniel Qyealy (Cook County Sheriff's Police)
- Norman H. Reeves (Gloucester County Prosecutor's Office)
- James W. Rossi (Cook County Sheriff's Police)
- Donald Ray Schuessler (Eugene Police Department)
- Hal F. Sharp (US Army Criminal Investigation Laboratory)
- Casimer J. Smerecki (Middlesex County Prosecutor's Office)
- Deborah J. Wakida (San Francisco Police Crime Laboratory)
- Anita K. Y. Wonder (Wonder Institute)
- Robert W. Young, Jr. (Columbus Police Department)
