= Lophine =

Names
- Other names 2,4,5-triphenylimidazole

Identifiers
CAS Number	484-47-9
3D model (JSmol)	Interactive image
ChEMBL	ChEMBL34173
ChemSpider	9815
ECHA InfoCard	100.006.915
EC Number	207-606-6
PubChem CID	10232
UNII	Q6K46G80ZD
CompTox Dashboard (EPA)	DTXSID3022039
- InChI: InChI=1S/C21H16N2/c1-4-10-16(11-5-1)19-20(17-12-6-2-7-13-17)23-21(22-19)18-14-8-3-9-15-18/h1-15H,(H,22,23) Key: RNIPJYFZGXJSDD-UHFFFAOYSA-N
- SMILES: C1=CC=C(C=C1)C2=C(N=C(N2)C3=CC=CC=C3)C4=CC=CC=C4

Properties
Chemical formula	C_{21}H_{16}N_{2}
Molar mass	296.373 g·mol^{−1}
Appearance	white solid
Density	1,0874 g/cm^{3}
Melting point	275 °C (527 °F; 548 K)

Hazards
- GHS labelling
Pictograms	(GHS06: Toxic)
Signal word	Danger
Hazard statements	H301
Precautionary statements	P264, P270, P301+P316, P321, P330, P405, P501
- Except where otherwise noted, data are given for materials in their standard state (at 25 °C [77 °F], 100 kPa). Infobox references

Lophine is the organic compound with the formula (C_{6}H_{5}C)_{2}N_{2}HCC_{6}H_{5}. It is a derivative of imidazole wherein all three carbon atoms have phenyl groups as substituents. A white solid, this compound gave the first example of chemiluminescence when its basic solutions were exposed to air. Its chemiluminescence continues to attract attention.

Lophine and its dihydro analogue amarine (meso-2,4,5-triphenyl-2-imidazoline) were discovered early in the history of organic chemistry (between 1841 and 1847), before the development of a structural theory of organic chemistry by Kekulé and Couper in the 1850s. Lophine is prepared by condensation of benzaldehyde, benzil, and ammonia.
