= Daniel Attinger =

Swiss-born American mechanical engineer

- Occupations: Mechanical engineer, researcher and academic
- Awards: NSF Early Career Award; Fellow, American Society of Mechanical Engineers

Academic background
- Education: BSc./MSc, Mechanical Engineering; Sc. D., Mechanical Engineering
- Alma mater: École Polytechnique Fédérale de Lausanne (EPFL); ETH Zurich
- Thesis: An Investigation of Molten Microdroplet Surface Deposition: Transient Behavior, Wetting Angle Dynamics and Substrate Melting Phenomenon.

Daniel Attinger is a mechanical engineer, researcher and academic. He is the founder and CEO of Attinger-Consulting, a US-based scientific consulting company.

Attinger has published over 80 research articles and has several patents registered in his name. His research focuses on forensics, bubble dynamics, and multiscale transport phenomena in energy and forensic applications.

Attinger is the recipient of the ASME-ICNMM Outstanding Researcher Award and NSF Early Career Award. He is an Honorary Professor at Amity University in India and a Fellow of the American Society of Mechanical Engineers. In 2013, Attinger was the Lead Editor of a special issue for the ASME Journal of Nanotechnology in Engineering and Medicine.

== Education ==
In 1997, Attinger received his combined bachelor's and master's degree in mechanical engineering from Ecole Polytechnique Fédérale de Lausanne (EPFL) in Switzerland. He completed his doctoral studies in technical sciences from Eidgenoessische Technische Hochschule (ETH Zurich) in 2001.

== Career ==
In 2002, Attinger moved from Switzerland to the US, working as assistant professor at Stony Brook University and from 2005 at Columbia University. In 2011, Attinger joined Iowa State University as a tenured associate professor of mechanical engineering. In 2014, he was named 'Professor of the Year' by the senior students of the Mechanical Engineering Department at Iowa State University, sharing the honor with colleague Starns. At ISU, Attinger was awarded a Presidential award for Interdisciplinary Research. He led a team of engineers and plant scientists to develop computationally engineered plants, a project that could have the same kind of impact on agriculture as biomedical engineering has had on medicine. In 2015, the faculty members of the Mechanical Engineering Department elected Attinger to be their faculty representative on the ISU Mechanical Engineering Leadership Committee.

In 2018, Attinger filed a federal lawsuit regarding university policies on faculty conduct and academic freedom. The matter was resolved through a settlement. Under the settlement terms, Attinger continued his research activities until his resignation in mid-2021.

He is the founder and CEO of Struo LLC, a scientific consulting company.

== Research ==
Attinger has conducted research in fluid dynamics, heat transfer, bloodstain pattern analysis and nanotechology. His research is relevant to the fields of biology, manufacturing, forensics, thermal management and energy transport.

=== Heat transfer ===
Attinger's early research with his Ph.D. advisor Poulikakos focused on heat transfer, fluid dynamics and solidification during the impact of molten drops on silicon wafers. He developed an imaging technique to visualize picoliter drop impacts with 5 microsecond resolution, equivalent to 200,000 frames per second. With Ph.D. student Amy Betz and colleagues, Attinger engineered surfaces with heterogeneous wettability for boiling heat transfer enhancement. Their research demonstrated that surfaces combining superhydrophilic and superhydrophobic patterns achieved exceptional pool boiling performance with high critical heat fluxes and heat transfer coefficients. During the late 2010s, Attinger and colleagues developed a stochastic-automata model for pool boiling that was two orders of magnitude faster than existing numerical methods.

=== Bloodstain pattern analysis ===
Attinger's research in bloodstain pattern analysis (BPA) has been funded by US Federal agencies including the National Institute of Justice and the US Army. In 2013, he led a critical review identifying research opportunities at the intersection of fluid dynamics and BPA.

With colleague De Brabanter and co-authors, Attinger proposed a method to reconstruct the area of origin of blood spatter patterns that accounts for the curvature of drop trajectories due to gravity and drag, providing solutions with pattern-specific uncertainty estimates. With Ph.D. student Liu and colleague De Brabanter, Attinger developed a machine learning framework to classify bloodstain patterns generated under gunshot or blunt impact, achieving classification accuracy as high as 99% for certain conditions.

Attinger and colleagues published two open-source databases of high-resolution bloodstain patterns, freely available for research and teaching purposes. With colleague Yarin and Ph.D. student Comiskey, Attinger proposed theoretical models predicting forward and backward blood spatter patterns caused by bullet wounds, showing how bullet shape influences droplet formation through Rayleigh-Taylor instability. His research in BPA has been discussed in several media outlets.

=== Fluid dynamics ===
Advising Ph.D. student Xu, Attinger studied ultrasound interactions with bubbles, observing traveling and standing waves including superharmonic waves explained as parametric resonance. Applications include enhanced mixing of reagents and on-demand generation of drops and bubbles with controlled timing and sizes from nanoliter to picoliter scales.

Mentoring Ph.D. student Bhardwaj, Attinger investigated the formation of ring-like patterns during evaporation of complex fluid drops. The experimental and numerical findings indicated radial flow patterns and possible formation of multiple rings. Together with colleague Somasundaran, they proposed a phase diagram to predict deposit patterns.

=== Nano-technology ===
With Ph.D. student Betz and UCLA colleague Kim, Attinger manufactured and characterized multi-scale patterned surfaces with heterogeneous wettability. With Orejon and coauthors, Attinger studiedcondensation performance and wetting behavior of multi-scale bio-inspired metallic surfaces with nanoscale features, examining surfaces resembling rose petals and lotus leaves.

== Awards and honors ==
- 2005 - NSF Early Career Award
- 2012 - ASME-ICNMM Outstanding Researcher Award
- 2013 - Laureate of one of seven Awards from the Iowa State Presidential Initiative for Interdisciplinary Research
- 2014 - Professor of the Year, Iowa State University Mechanical Engineering Department

== Selected articles ==
- A. R. Betz, J. Jenkins, C.-J. Kim, and D. Attinger, (2013). "Boiling heat transfer on superhydrophilic, superhydrophobic, and superbiphilic surfaces." International Journal of Heat and Mass Transfer 57(2): 733–741.
- Betz, A., J. Xu, H. Qiu, and D. Attinger, Do surfaces with mixed hydrophilic and hydrophobic areas enhance pool boiling? Appl. Phys. Lett. 97, 141909 (2010); doi:10.1063/1.3485057.
- Bhardwaj R., Fang X. and Attinger D., Pattern formation during the evaporation of a colloidal nanoliter drop: a numerical and experimental study, New Journal of Physics, vol. 11, p. 075020, 2009.
- D. Attinger, C. Frankiewicz, A. R. Betz, T. M. Schutzius, R. Ganguly, A. Das, C.-J. Kim, and C. M. Megaridis, "Surface engineering for phase change heat transfer: A review," MRS Energy & Sustainability, vol. 1, 2014, pp. 1–40
- D. Attinger, Z. Zhao, and D. Poulikakos, An Experimental Study of Molten Microdroplet Surface Deposition and Solidification: Transient Behavior and Wetting Angle Dynamics, ASME Journal of Heat Transfer Vol. 122 (3), pp. 544–556, 2000
- D. Attinger, C. Moore, A. Donaldson, A. Jafari, and H. A. Stone, "Fluid dynamics topics in bloodstain pattern analysis: comparative review and research opportunities," (in eng), Forensic Sci Int, vol. 231, no. 1–3, pp. 375–96, 2013.
- D. Attinger, P. M. Comiskey, A. L. Yarin, and K. De Brabanter, "Determining the region of origin of blood spatter patterns considering fluid dynamics and statistical uncertainties," Forensic Science International, vol. 298, pp. 323–331, 2019.
- Y. Liu, D. Attinger, and K. De Brabanter, "Automatic Classification of Bloodstain Patterns Caused by Gunshot and Blunt Impact at Various Distances," Journal of Forensic Sciences, vol. 65, no. 3, pp. 729–743, 2020.
