= Phosphorus oxide =

Phosphorus oxide can refer to:

- Phosphorus pentoxide (phosphorus(V) oxide, phosphoric anhydride), P_{2}O_{5}
- Phosphorus trioxide (phosphorus(III) oxide, phosphorous anhydride), P_{2}O_{3}
- Phosphorus tetroxide, P_{2}O_{4}

Between the commercially important P_{4}O_{6} and P_{4}O_{10}, several other, less common oxides of phosphorus are known. Specifically, P_{4}O_{7}, P_{4}O_{9}, and P_{2}O_{6} all bear structures intermediate between the endmembers:

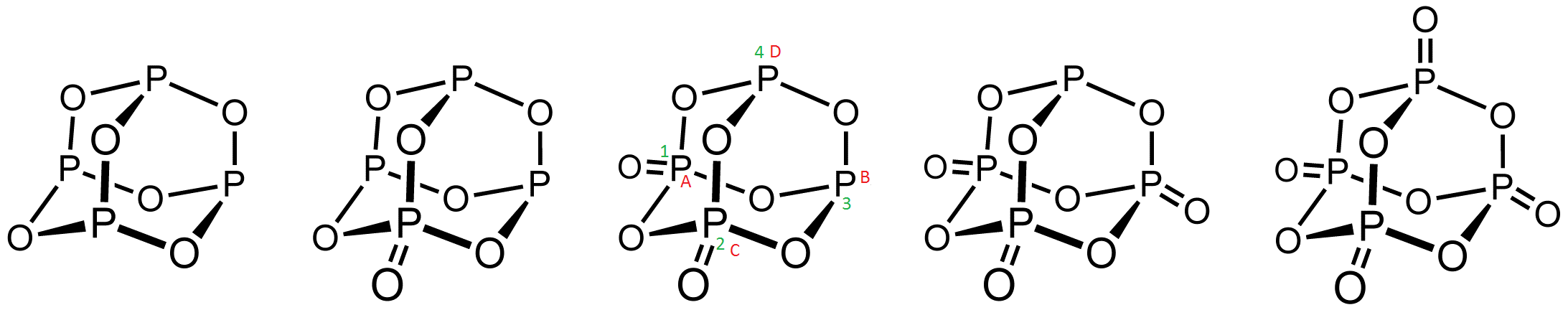

On observation it will be seen that double bonded oxygen in P_{4}O_{8} at 1,2 position or 1,3 position are identical and both positions have same steric hindrance. Cycle 12341 and ABCDA are identical.

Gases:

- Phosphorus monoxide, PO
- Phosphorus dioxide, PO_{2}
