= (2-Nitrophenyl)acetic acid =

Chemical compound

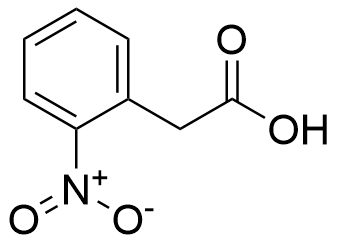
- Styrene

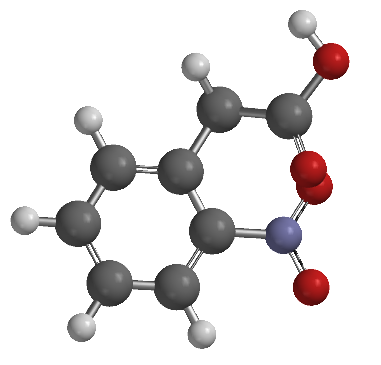

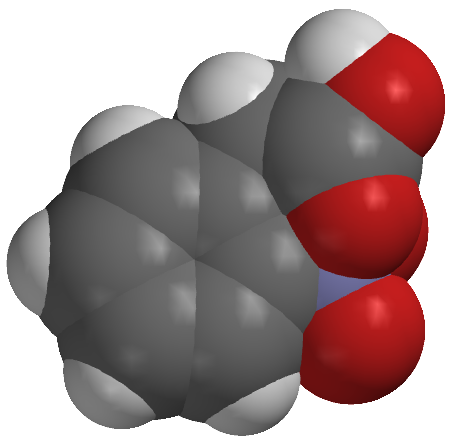

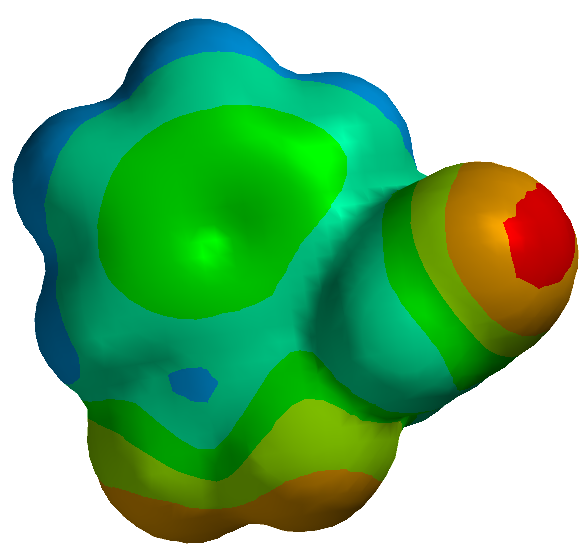

Names
- Preferred IUPAC name (2-Nitrophenyl)acetic acid
- Other names Benzeneacetic acid, 2-nitro- o-Nitrophenylacetic acid 2-nitrophenylacetic acid (ortho-Nitrophenyl)acetic acid acetic acid, (o-nitrophenyl); 2-(o-nitrophenyl)acetic acid 2-(2-nitrophenyl)acetic acid

Identifiers
| CAS Number | 3740-52-1 |
| 3D model (JSmol) | Interactive image |
| ChEBI | CHEBI:187870 |
| ChemSpider | 69754 |
| ECHA InfoCard | 100.021.026 |
| EC Number | 223-128-0 |
| PubChem CID | 77337 |
| UNII | 05TN0SUY38 |
| CompTox Dashboard (EPA) | DTXSID0063157 |
- InChI: InChI=1S/C8H7NO4/c10-8(11)5-6-3-1-2-4-7(6)9(12)13/h1-4H,5H2,(H,10,11)
- SMILES: C1=CC=C(C(=C1)CC(=O)O)[N+](=O)[O-]

Properties
| Chemical formula | C_{8}H_{7}NO_{4} |
| Molar mass | 181.15 g/mol |
| Appearance | Yellow to Pale Brown Crystalline Powder |
| Density | 1.4 g/cm^{3} |
| Boiling point | 141 °C (286 °F; 414 K) |
| Solubility in water | 0.1417% (20 °C) |

Hazards
- Occupational safety and health (OHS/OSH)
| Main hazards | Irritant |
- GHS labelling
| Pictograms | (GHS07: Exclamation mark) (GHS08: Health hazard) |
| Signal word | Warning |
| Hazard statements | H315, H319, H335, H341 |
| Precautionary statements | P261, P264, P271, P280, P302+P352, P304+P340, P305+P351+P338, P317, P319, P321, P332, P362+P364, P403+P233, P405, P501 |
| NFPA 704 (fire diamond) | 2 0 0 |
| Safety data sheet (SDS) | MSDS |

Related compounds
| Related derivatives; related aromatic compounds | phenylacetic acid,4-nitrophenylacetic acid; 4-nitrophenol, 2-nitrodiphenylamine |
- Except where otherwise noted, data are given for materials in their standard state (at 25 °C [77 °F], 100 kPa). verify (what is ?) Infobox references

2-Nitrophenylacetic acid is an organic compound used in organic synthesis that has also been used as an herbicide. It is a derivative of phenylacetic acid, containing a phenyl functional group, a carboxylic acid functional group, and a nitro functional group. It is an important reagent for many organic reactions, especially for the formation of heterocycles.

== Synthesis ==
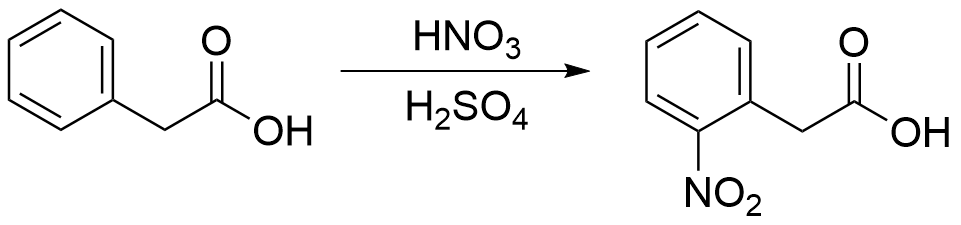
This compound may be prepared by the nitration of phenylacetic acid.

== Applications ==
In organic synthesis, 2-nitrophenylacetic acid can be used as a protecting group for primary alcohols. The alcohol is esterified with 2-nitrophenylacetic acid, proceeding through the acid chloride or acid anhydride. The acid itself can also protect the alcohol through the Mitsunobu reaction: reacting the alcohol and the acid with diethyl azidocarboxylate and triphenylphosphine in dichloromethane. The protecting group is selectively removed using zinc and ammonium chloride, and is compatible with other existing alcohol protecting groups.
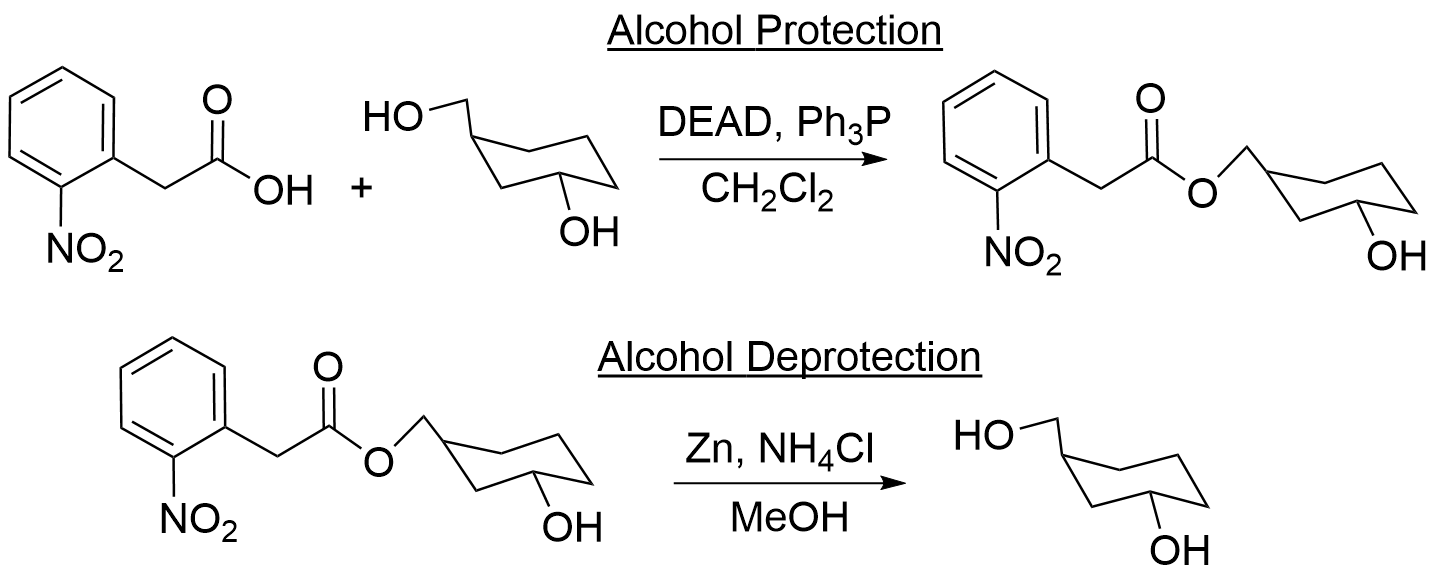

In addition, 2-nitrophenylacetic acid is a precursor for many heterocycles. Complete reduction of 2-nitrophenylacetic acid yields anilines, which quickly cyclize to form lactams. Partial reductive cyclization of the acids using weaker reducing agents forms hydroxamic acids.

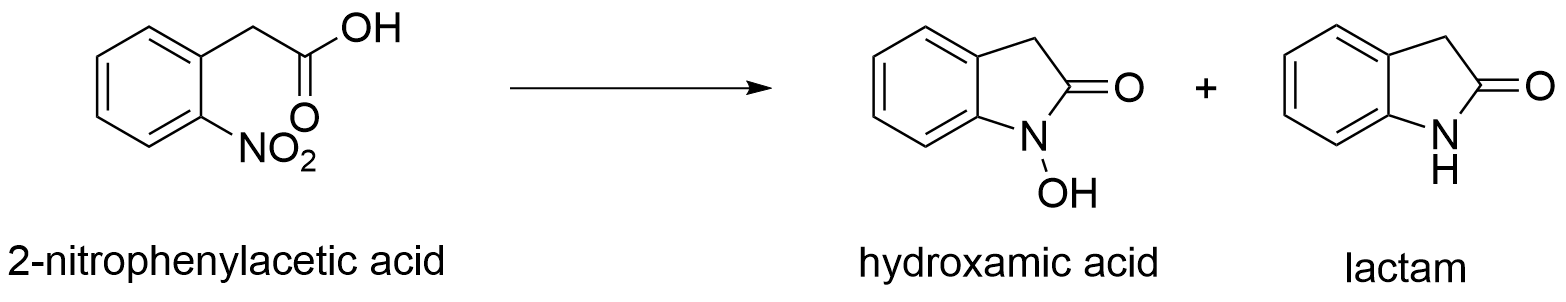

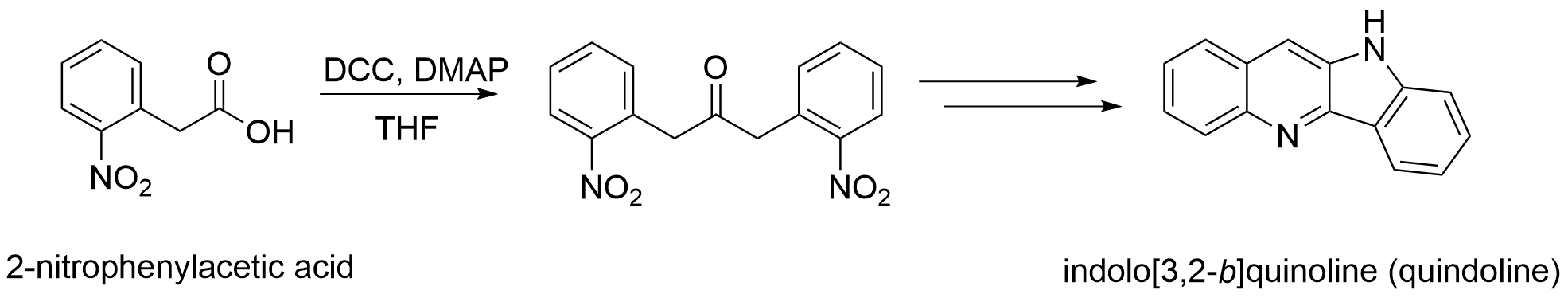
Both of these processes are useful in the synthesis of many biologically active molecules. 2-nitrophenylacetic acid is a precursor of quindoline, which although it does not have many practical applications on its own, quindoline derivatives and modifications can be treated as enzyme inhibitors and anticancer agents.

Derivatives of 2-nitrophenylacetic acids are useful in total synthesis for their ability to form heterocycles. 2-nitrophenylacetic acid is a precursor to (−)-phaitanthrin D, a clinically useful molecule originally isolated from the Phaius mishmensis orchid. The carboxylic acid on the 2-nitrophenylacetic acid is first protected using menthol, 1-ethyl-3-(3-dimethylaminopropyl)carbodiimide (EDCl), hydroxybenzotriazole(HOBt) and N,N-iisopropylethylamine(DIPEA). A pattern of reducing the nitro group to an amino group and subsequently forming amides by the addition to carboxylic acids (namely nitrobenzoic acid) occurs. Reductive cyclization of the subsequent product using hexamethyldisilazane, zinc chloride and dimethylformamide forms the disubstituted heterocycle present in the (−)-phaitantrin D molecule.

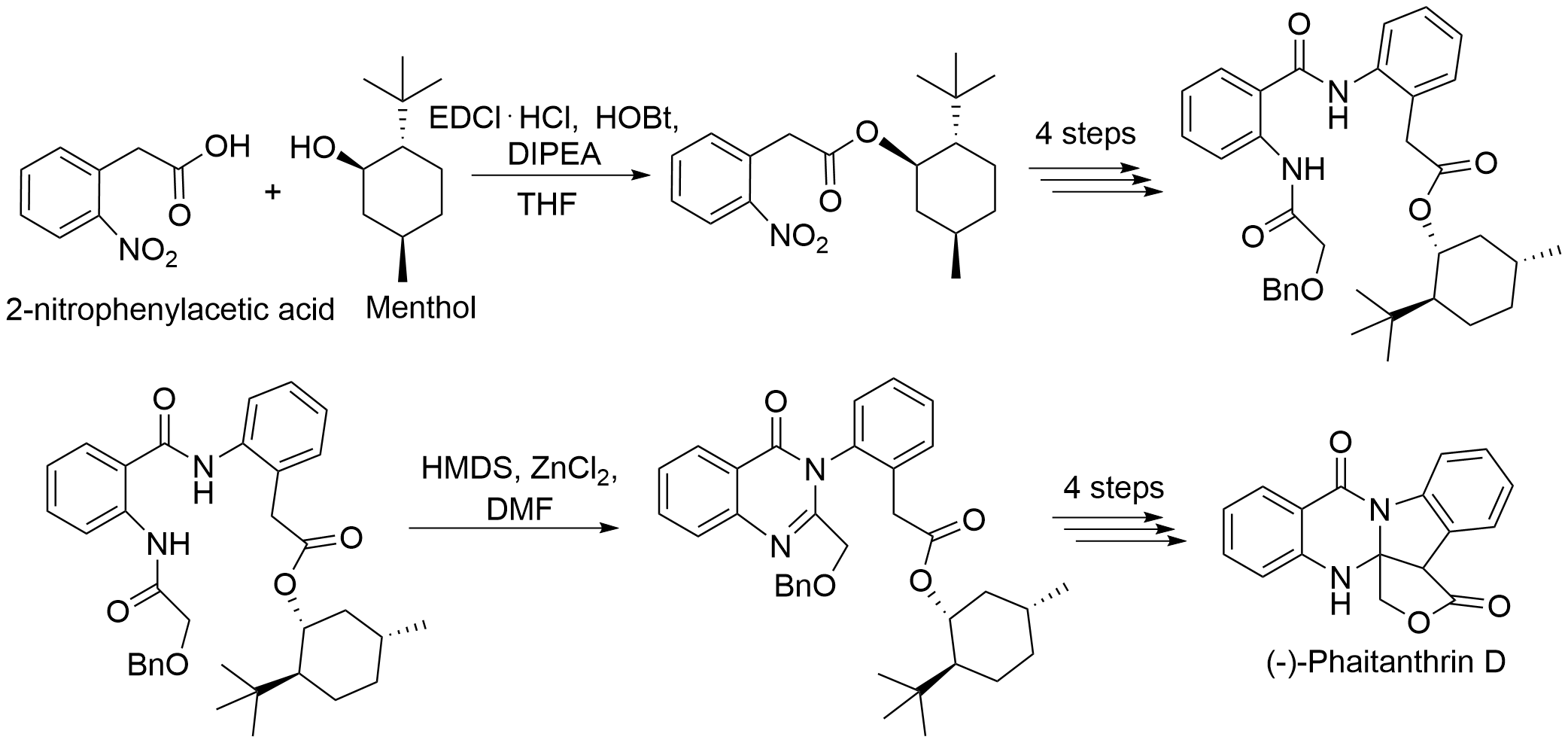
Outside of organic synthesis, 2-nitrophenylacetic acid has been used as an herbicide, as it displays selective herbicidal properties. It has also been used as an internal standard for measurement of salicylamide-O-acetic acid (an anti-asthma drug) using high performance liquid chromatography.
