= Chemiluminescence =

Emission of light as a result of a chemical reaction

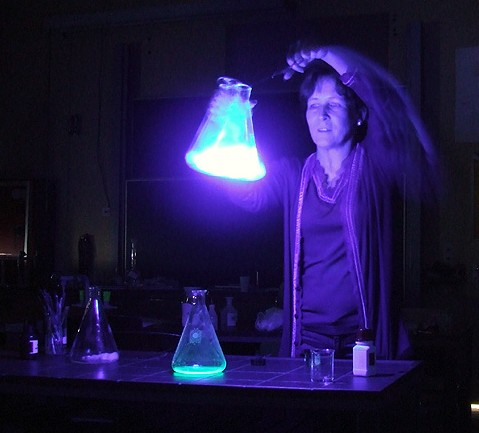
A chemoluminescent reaction in an Erlenmeyer flask

Chemiluminescence (also chemoluminescence) is the emission of light (luminescence) as the result of a chemical reaction, i.e. a chemical reaction resulting in a flash or glow of light. A standard example of chemiluminescence in the laboratory setting is the luminol test wherein blood is indicated by luminescence upon contact with iron in hemoglobin. A light stick also emits light by chemiluminescence.

When chemiluminescence takes place in living organisms, the phenomenon is called bioluminescence.

== Physical description ==
As in many chemical reactions, chemiluminescence starts with the combining of two compounds, say A and B, to give a product C. Unlike most chemical reactions, the product C converts to a further product, which is produced in an electronically excited state often indicated with an asterisk:

A + B → C
C → D*

D* then emits a photon (hν), to give the ground state of D:

D* → D + hν

For example, A could be luminol and B could be hydrogen peroxide. D would be 3-aminophthalate (3-APA).

In theory, one photon of light should be given off for each molecule of reactant. In practice, the yield ("quantum efficiency") is often low owing to side reactions.

Chemiluminescence differs from fluorescence or phosphorescence in that the electronic excited state is the product of a chemical reaction rather than of the absorption of a photon. It is the antithesis of a photochemical reaction, in which light is used to drive an endothermic chemical reaction. Instead, here light is generated from a chemically exothermic reaction. The chemiluminescence might be also induced by an electrochemical stimulus and in that case, it is called electrochemiluminescence.

Bioluminescence in nature: A male firefly mating with a female of the species Lampyris noctiluca

== Liquid-phase reactions ==
Chemiluminescence was first observed with lophine (triphenylimidazole). When in basic solution, this compound converts to imidazolate, which reacts with oxygen to eventually give a dioxetane. Fragmentation of dioxetane gives the excited state of an anionic diamide.

Steps leading up to chemiluminescence of lophine

Chemiluminescence in an aqueous system is mainly caused by redox reactions.

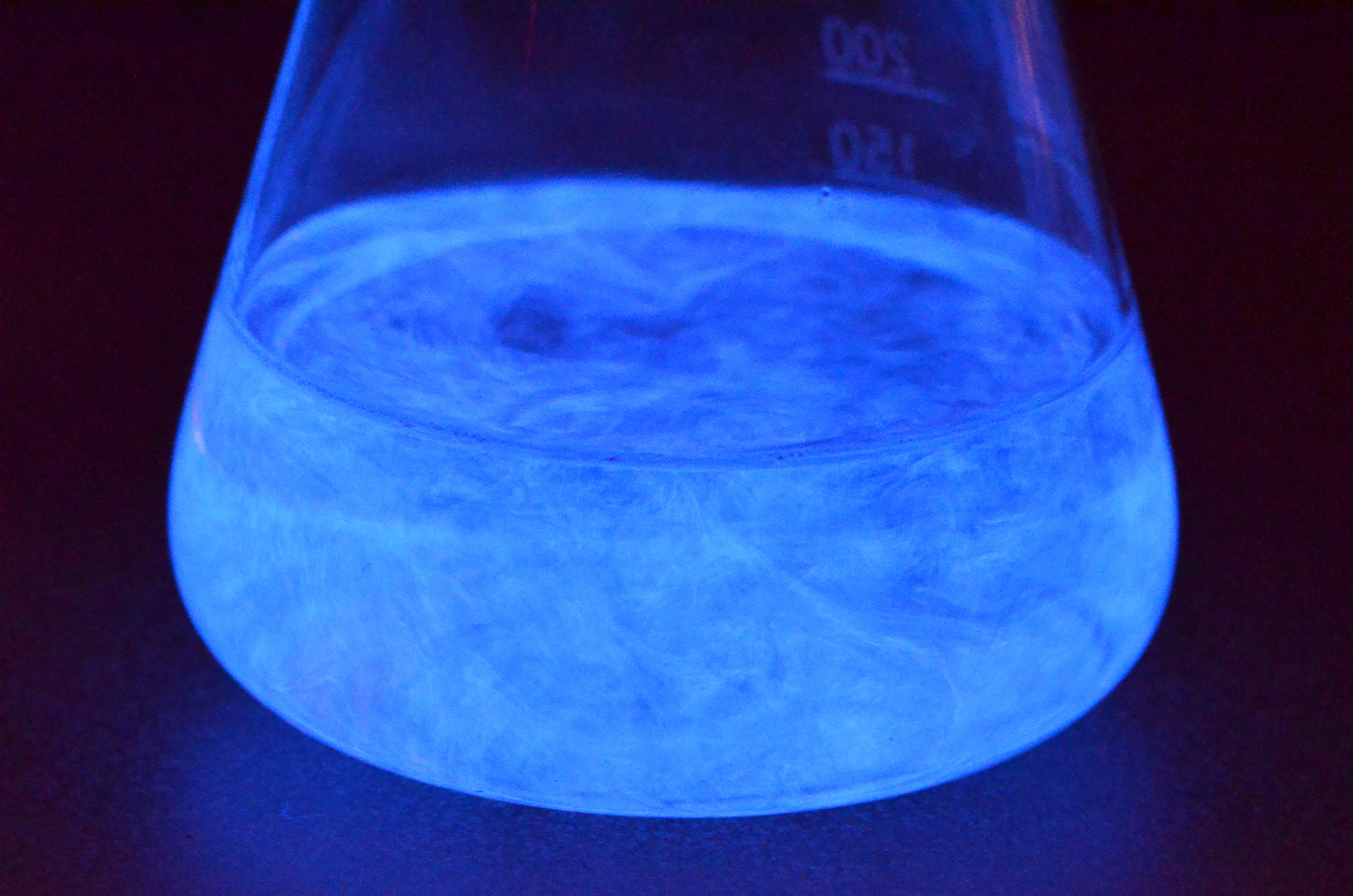
Chemiluminescence after a reaction of hydrogen peroxide and luminol

Luminol in an alkaline solution with hydrogen peroxide in the presence of iron or copper, or an auxiliary oxidant, produces 3-aminophtalate in an excited state, which exhibits chemiluminescence. The luminol reaction is

$\ce{\underset{luminol}{C8H7N3O2} + \underset{hydrogen\ peroxide}{H2O2} -> 3-APA[\lozenge] -> {3-APA} + light}$

== Gas-phase reactions ==
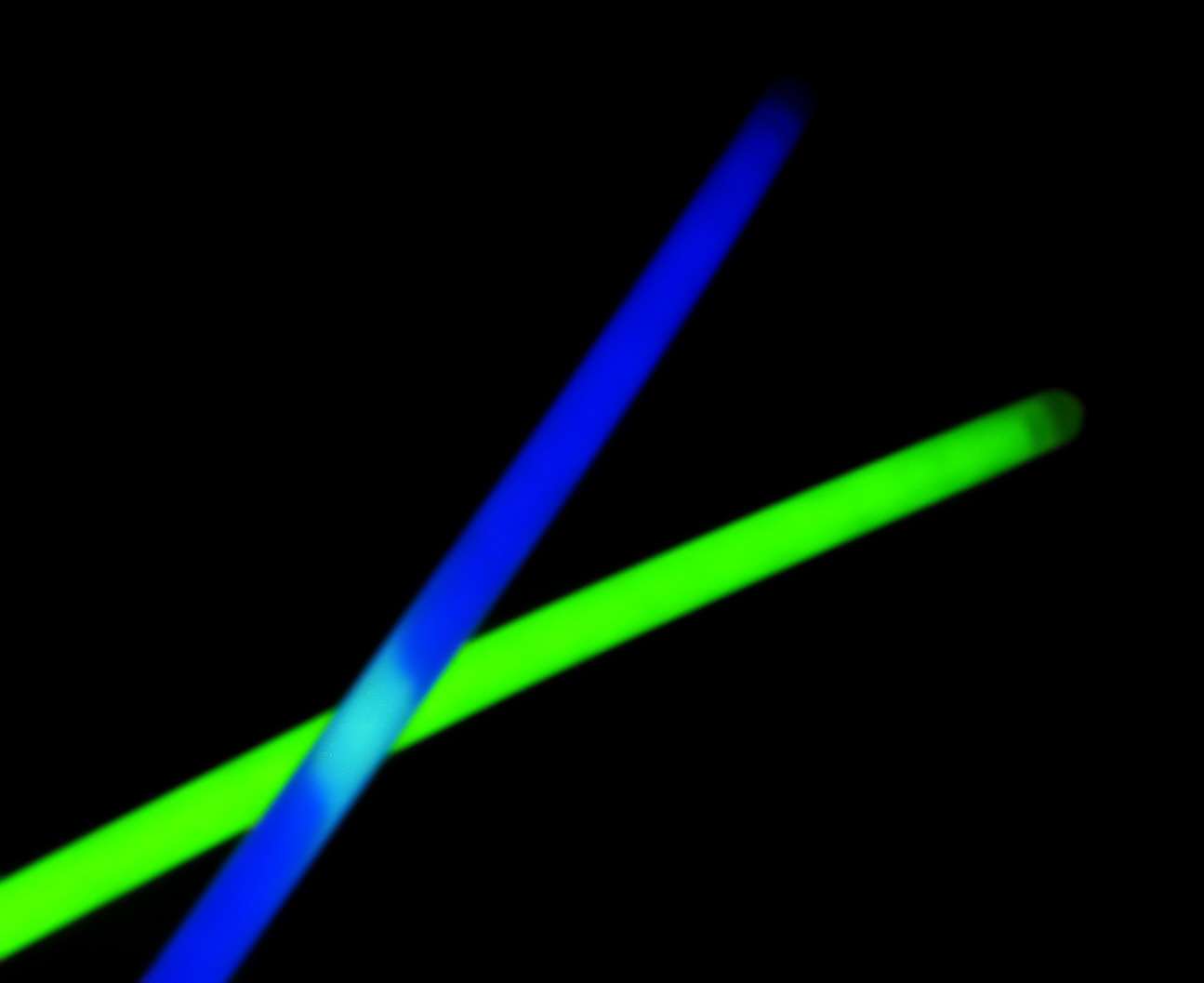
Green and blue glow sticks

One of the oldest known chemiluminescent reactions is that of elemental white phosphorus oxidizing in moist air, producing a green glow. This is a gas-phase reaction of phosphorus vapor, above the solid, with oxygen producing excited states of (PO)_{2} and HPO.

Another gas phase reaction is the basis of nitric oxide detection in commercial analytic instruments applied to environmental air-quality testing. Ozone (O_{3}) is combined with nitric oxide (NO) to form nitrogen dioxide (NO_{2}) in an activated state [◊]:

^{•}NO + O_{3} → ^{•}NO_{2} + O_{2} + hν

The activated NO_{2}[◊] luminesces broadband visible to infrared light as it reverts to a lower energy state. A photomultiplier and associated electronics count the photons that are proportional to the amount of nitric oxide (NO) present. To determine the amount of nitrogen dioxide, NO_{2}, in a sample (containing no NO), it must first be converted to NO by passing the sample through a converter before the above ozone activation reaction is applied. The ozone reaction produces a photon count proportional to NO that is proportional to NO_{2} before it was converted to NO. In the case of a mixed sample that contains both NO and NO_{2}, the above reaction yields the amount of NO and NO_{2} combined in the air sample, assuming that the sample is passed through the converter. If the mixed sample is not passed through the converter, the ozone reaction produces activated NO_{2}[◊] only in proportion to the NO in the sample. The NO_{2} in the sample is not activated by the ozone reaction. Though unactivated NO_{2} is present with the activated NO_{2}[◊], photons are emitted only by the activated species that is proportional to original NO. The final step is to subtract NO from (NO + NO_{2}) to yield NO_{2}

== Infrared chemiluminescence ==
In chemical kinetics, infrared chemiluminiscence (IRCL) refers to the emission of infrared photons from vibrationally excited product molecules immediately after their formation. The intensities of infrared emission lines from vibrationally excited molecules are used to measure the populations of vibrational states of product molecules.

The observation of IRCL was developed as a kinetic technique by John Polanyi, who used it to study the attractive or repulsive nature of the potential energy surface for gas-phase reactions. In general the IRCL is much more intense for reactions with an attractive surface, indicating that this type of surface leads to energy deposition in vibrational excitation. In contrast reactions with a repulsive potential energy surface lead to little IRCL, indicating that the energy is primarily deposited as translational energy.

== Enhanced chemiluminescence ==
Enhanced chemiluminescence (ECL) is a common technique for a variety of detection assays in biology. A horseradish peroxidase enzyme (HRP) is tethered to an antibody that specifically recognizes the molecule of interest. This enzyme complex then catalyzes the conversion of the enhanced chemiluminescent substrate into a sensitized reagent in the vicinity of the molecule of interest, which on further oxidation by hydrogen peroxide, produces a triplet (excited) carbonyl, which emits light when it decays to the singlet carbonyl. Enhanced chemiluminescence allows detection of minute quantities of a biomolecule. Proteins can be detected down to femtomole quantities, well below the detection limit for most assay systems.

== Applications ==
- Gas analysis: for determining small amounts of impurities or poisons in air. Other compounds can also be determined by this method (ozone, N-oxides, S-compounds). A typical example is NO determination with detection limits down to 1 ppb. Highly specialised chemiluminescence detectors have been used recently to determine concentrations as well as fluxes of NO_{x} with detection limits as low as 5 ppt.
- Analysis of inorganic species in liquid phase
- Analysis of organic species: useful with enzymes, where the substrate is not directly involved in the chemiluminescence reaction, but the product is
- Detection and assay of biomolecules in systems such as ELISA and Western blots
- DNA sequencing using pyrosequencing
- Lighting objects. Chemiluminescence kites, emergency lighting, glow sticks (party decorations).
- Combustion analysis: Certain free radical species (such as ^{•}CH and ^{•}OH) give off radiation at specific wavelengths. The heat release rate is calculated by measuring the amount of light radiated from a flame at those wavelengths.
- Children's toys

== Biological applications ==
Chemiluminescence has been applied by forensic scientists to solve crimes. In this case, they use luminol and hydrogen peroxide. The iron from the blood acts as a catalyst and reacts with the luminol and hydrogen peroxide to produce blue light for about 30 seconds. Because only a small amount of iron is required for chemiluminescence, trace amounts of blood are sufficient.

In biomedical research, the protein that gives fireflies their glow and its co-factor, luciferin, are used to produce red light through the consumption of adenosine triphosphate (ATP). This reaction is used in many applications, including the effectiveness of cancer drugs that choke off a tumor's blood supply. This form of bioluminescence imaging allows scientists to test drugs in the pre-clinical stages cheaply. Another protein, aequorin, found in certain jellyfish, produces blue light in the presence of calcium. It can be used in molecular biology to assess calcium levels in cells. What these biological reactions have in common is their use of ATP as an energy source. Though the structure of the molecules that produce luminescence is different for each species, they are given the generic name of luciferin. Firefly luciferin can be oxidized to produce an excited complex. Once it falls back down to a ground state a photon is released. It is very similar to the reaction with luminol.

$$\ce{Luciferin{} + O2{} + ATP ->[\text{Luciferase}] Oxyluciferin{} + CO2{} + AMP{} + PPi{} + light}$$

Many organisms have evolved to produce light in a range of colors. At the molecular level, the difference in color arises from the degree of conjugation of the molecule, when an electron drops down from the excited state to the ground state. Deep sea organisms have evolved to produce light to lure and catch prey, as camouflage, or to attract others. Some bacteria even use bioluminescence to communicate. The common colors for the light emitted by these animals are blue and green because they have shorter wavelengths than red and can transmit more easily in water.

In April 2020, researchers reported having genetically engineered plants glow much brighter than previously possible by inserting genes of the bioluminescent mushroom Neonothopanus nambi. The glow is self-sustained, works by converting plants' caffeic acid into luciferin and, unlike for bacterial bioluminescence genes used earlier, has a relatively high light output that is visible to the naked eye.

Chemiluminescence is different from fluorescence. Hence, fluorescent proteins such as green fluorescent protein (GFP) are not chemiluminescent. However, combining GFP with luciferases allows bioluminescence resonance energy transfer (BRET), which increases the quantum yield of light emitted in these systems.

== See also ==
- Eclox
- Electrochemiluminescence
- List of light sources
- Lyoluminescence
- Will-o'-the-wisp
