= Phosphorus dioxide =

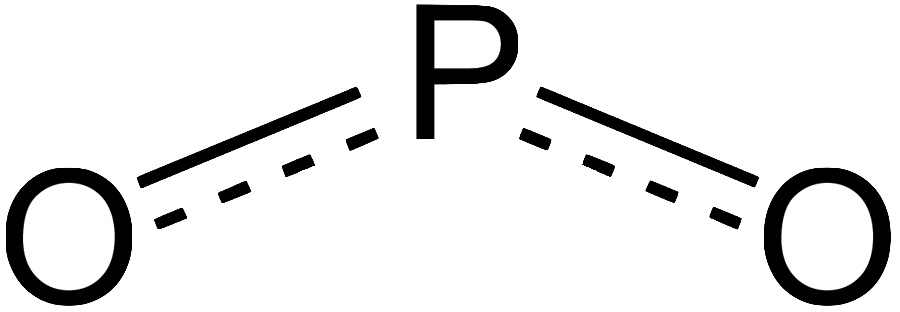

Names
- IUPAC name Phosphorus(IV) oxide
- Other names Phosphorus dioxide

Identifiers
CAS Number	12164-97-5
3D model (JSmol)	Interactive image
ChEBI	CHEBI:37370
ChemSpider	122825
Gmelin Reference	1065
PubChem CID	139273
CompTox Dashboard (EPA)	DTXSID60153329
- InChI: InChI=1S/O2P/c1-3-2 Key: CJDZTJNITSFKRE-UHFFFAOYSA-N
- SMILES: O=P[O]

Properties
Chemical formula	O_{2}P
Molar mass	62.972 g·mol^{−1}

ThermochemistryCRC Handbook of Chemistry and Physics, 2005
Heat capacity (C)	39.5 joules (9.4 cal) per mole per K
Std molar entropy (S^{⦵}_{298})	252.1 joules (60.3 cal) per mole per K
Std enthalpy of formation (Δ_{f}H^{⦵}_{298})	−279.9 joules (−66.9 cal) per mole
Gibbs free energy (Δ_{f}G^{⦵})	−281.6 joules (−67.3 cal) per mole
- Except where otherwise noted, data are given for materials in their standard state (at 25 °C [77 °F], 100 kPa). Infobox references

Phosphorus dioxide (PO_{2}) is a gaseous oxide of phosphorus. It is a free radical that plays a role in the chemiluminescence of phosphorus and phosphine. It is produced when phosphates are heated to high temperatures.

In the ground state the molecule is bent, like nitrogen dioxide, but there is an excited state that is linear.
