= 3-Aminophthalic acid =

Names
- Preferred IUPAC name 3-Aminobenzene-1,2-dicarboxylic acid
- Other names 3-Aminophthalic acid

Identifiers
CAS Number	5434-20-8; 27846-29-3 (dianion)
3D model (JSmol)	Interactive image
ChemSpider	71803
ECHA InfoCard	100.024.178
PubChem CID	79490
UNII	7XV0V19ZDG
CompTox Dashboard (EPA)	DTXSID9063879
- InChI: InChI=1S/C8H7NO4/c9-5-3-1-2-4(7(10)11)6(5)8(12)13/h1-3H,9H2,(H,10,11)(H,12,13) Key: WGLQHUKCXBXUDV-UHFFFAOYSA-N
- SMILES: c1cc(c(c(c1)N)C(=O)O)C(=O)O

Properties
Chemical formula	C_{8}H_{7}NO_{4}
Molar mass	181.147 g·mol^{−1}
- Except where otherwise noted, data are given for materials in their standard state (at 25 °C [77 °F], 100 kPa). Infobox references

3-Aminophthalic acid is a product of the oxidation of luminol. The reaction requires the presence of a catalyst. A mixture of luminol and hydrogen peroxide is used in forensics. When the mixture is sprayed on an area that contains blood, the iron in the hemoglobin in the blood catalyzes a reaction between the mixture, resulting in 3-aminophthalate which gives out light by chemiluminescence.

Luminol reaction
