= Luminol =

Chemical compound

- Chemical structure of luminol

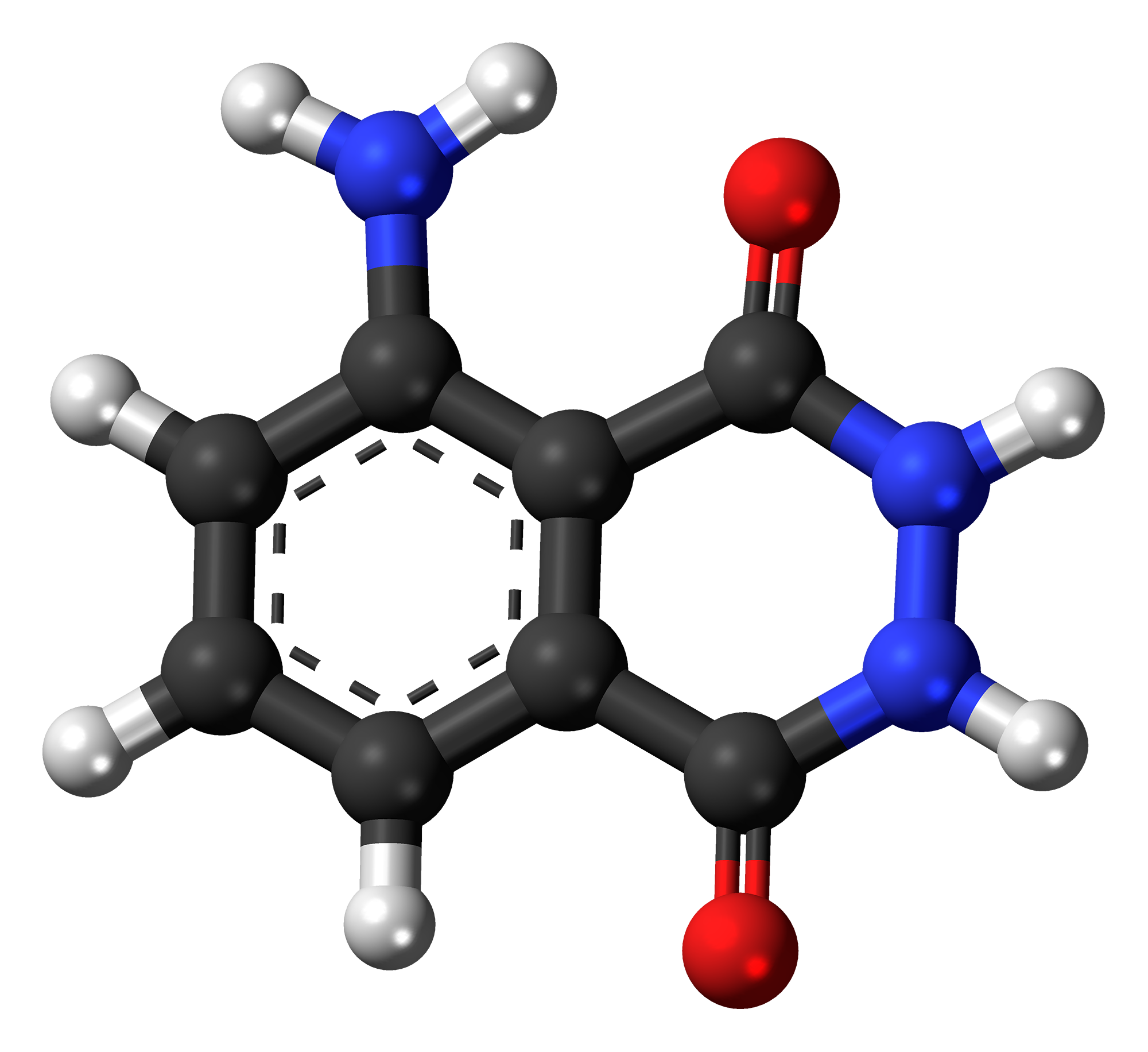

Names
- Preferred IUPAC name 5-Amino-2,3-dihydrophthalazine-1,4-dione
- Other names 5-Amino-2,3-dihydro-1,4-phthalazinedione o-Aminophthaloyl hydrazide o-Aminophthalyl hydrazide 3-Aminophthalhydrazide; 3-Aminophthalic hydrazide

Identifiers
CAS Number	521-31-3
3D model (JSmol)	Interactive image
ChEMBL	ChEMBL442329
ChemSpider	10192
ECHA InfoCard	100.007.556
EC Number	208-309-4
PubChem CID	10638
UNII	5EXP385Q4F
CompTox Dashboard (EPA)	DTXSID5024504
- InChI: InChI=1S/C8H7N3O2/c9-5-3-1-2-4-6(5)8(13)11-10-7(4)12/h1-3H,9H2,(H,10,12)(H,11,13) Key: HWYHZTIRURJOHG-UHFFFAOYSA-N; InChI=1/C8H7N3O2/c9-5-3-1-2-4-6(5)8(13)11-10-7(4)12/h1-3H,9H2,(H,10,12)(H,11,13) Key: HWYHZTIRURJOHG-UHFFFAOYAB
- SMILES: C1=CC2=C(C(=C1)N)C(=O)NNC2=O

Properties
Chemical formula	C_{8}H_{7}N_{3}O_{2}
Molar mass	177.16 g/mol
Melting point	319 °C (606 °F; 592 K)

Hazards
NFPA 704 (fire diamond)	2 1 0
Safety data sheet (SDS)	MSDS for luminol
- Except where otherwise noted, data are given for materials in their standard state (at 25 °C [77 °F], 100 kPa). verify (what is ?) Infobox references

Luminol (C_{8}H_{7}N_{3}O_{2}) is a chemical that exhibits chemiluminescence, with a blue glow, when mixed with an appropriate oxidizing agent. Luminol is a white-to-pale-yellow crystalline solid that is soluble in most polar organic solvents but insoluble in water.

Forensic investigators use luminol to detect trace amounts of blood at crime scenes, as it reacts with the iron in hemoglobin. Biologists use it in cellular assays to detect copper, iron, and cyanides as well as specific proteins via western blotting.

When luminol is sprayed evenly across an area, trace amounts of an activating oxidant make the luminol emit a blue glow that can be seen in a darkened room. The glow only lasts about 30 seconds but can be documented photographically. The glow is stronger in areas receiving more spray; the intensity of the glow does not indicate the amount of blood or other activator present.

== Synthesis ==
Luminol is synthesized in a two-step process, beginning with 3-nitrophthalic acid. First, hydrazine (N_{2}H_{4}) is heated with the 3-nitrophthalic acid in a high-boiling solvent such as triethylene glycol and glycerol. A condensation reaction occurs, with loss of water, forming 3-nitrophthalhydrazide. Reduction of the nitro group to an amino group with sodium dithionite (Na_{2}S_{2}O_{4}), via a transient hydroxylamine intermediate, produces luminol.

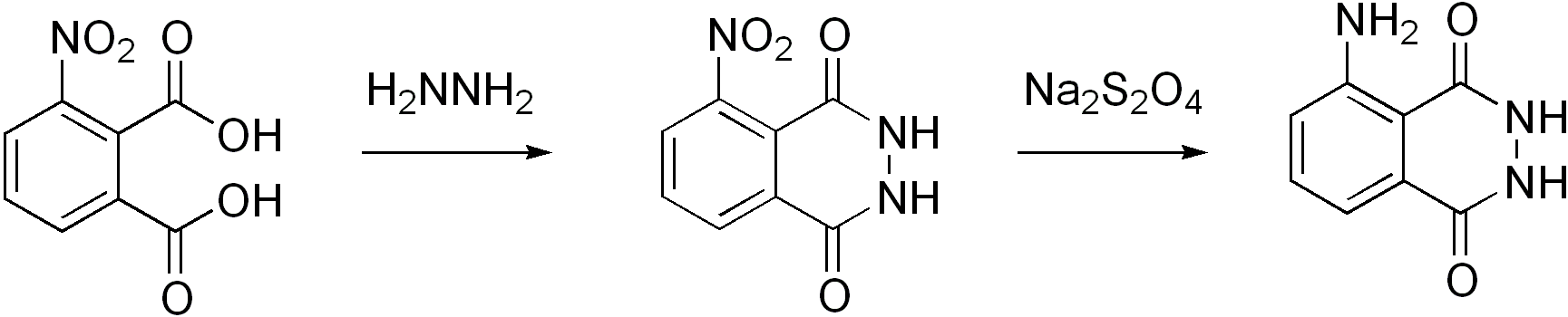

The compound was first synthesized in Germany in 1902 but was not named luminol until 1934.

== Chemiluminescence ==
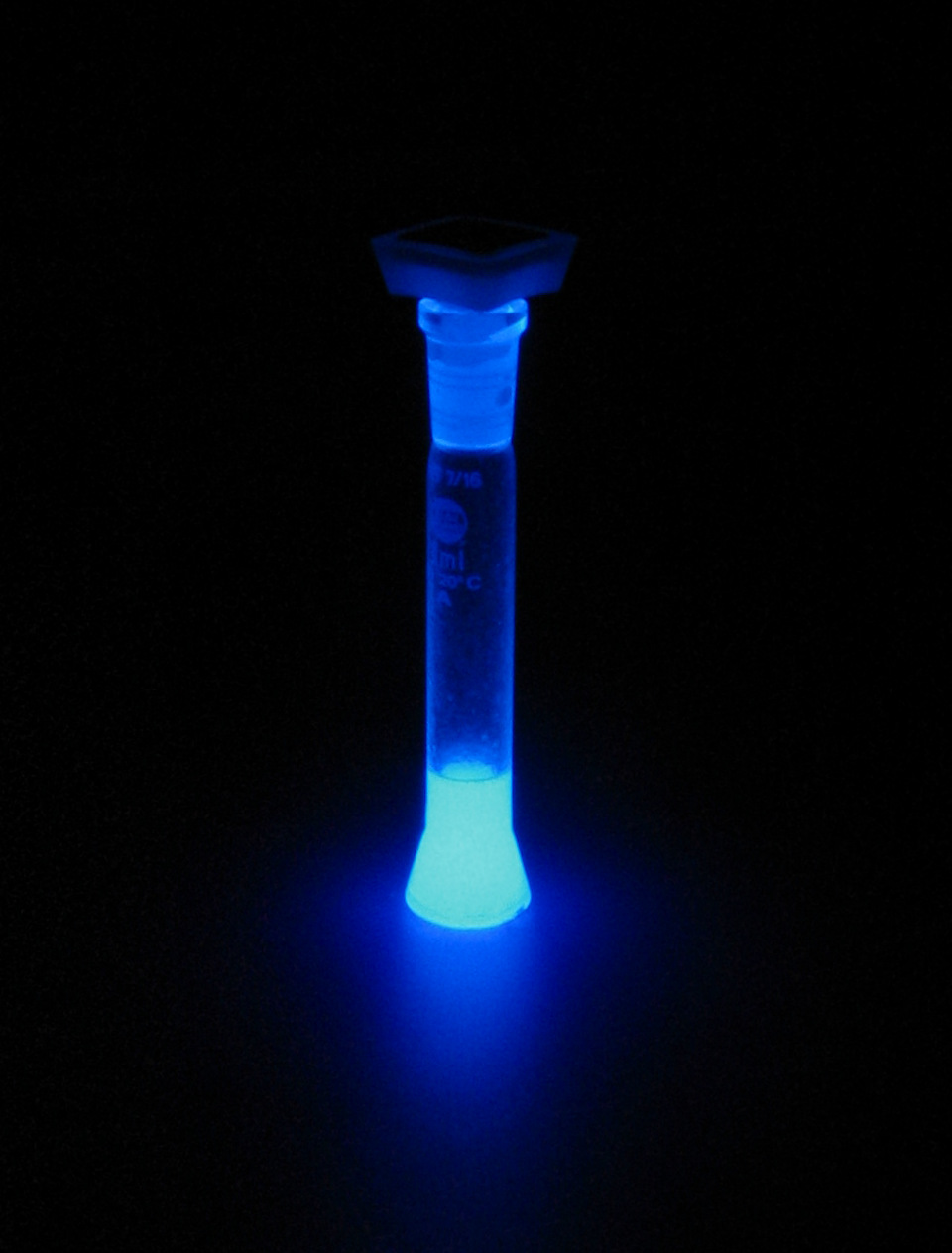
Chemiluminescence of luminol

Oxidation of luminol produces luminescence. Basic aqueous hydrogen peroxide (H_{2}O_{2}) is a typical oxidant. In the presence of a catalyst such as an iron or periodate compound, the hydrogen peroxide decomposes to form oxygen and water. Laboratory settings often use potassium ferricyanide or potassium periodate for the catalyst. In the forensic detection of blood, the catalyst is the iron present in hemoglobin. Enzymes in a variety of biological systems may also catalyse the decomposition of hydrogen peroxide.

The mechanism of luminol chemiluminescence involves a multi-step reaction. Luminol is deprotonated to produce an anion that is then oxidized to give the key intermediate α-hydroxy- peroxide. After cyclization to the endoperoxide, the mono-anion will undergo decomposition without luminescence if the pH is too low (< 8.2) for a second deprotonation. The endoperoxide dianion, however, can give the retro-Diels–Alder product: 1,2-dioxane-3,6-dione dianion which, after chemiexcitation by two single-electron transfers (SET) gives 3-aminophthalate dianion in its first singlet excited state (S1). This highly unstable molecule relaxes to the ground state, emitting light of around 425 nm wavelength (purple-blue) in the process termed chemiluminescence.

== Use in criminal investigation ==
=== History ===
In 1928, German chemist H. O. Albrecht found that blood, among other substances, enhanced the luminescence of luminol in an alkaline solution of hydrogen peroxide. In 1936, Karl Gleu and Karl Pfannstiel confirmed this enhancement in the presence of haematin, a component of blood. In 1937, German forensic scientist Walter Specht made extensive studies of luminol's application to the detection of blood at crime scenes. In 1939, San Francisco pathologists Frederick Proescher and A. M. Moody made three important observations about luminol:

1. although the test is presumptive, large areas of suspected material can be examined rapidly;
2. dried and decomposed blood gave a stronger and more lasting reaction than fresh blood; and
3. if the luminescence disappears, it may be reproduced by the application of a fresh luminol–hydrogen-peroxide solution; dried bloodstains may thus be made luminescent repeatedly.

=== Theory ===
Crime scene investigators use luminol to find traces of blood, even if someone has cleaned or removed it. The investigator sprays a solution of luminol and the oxidant. The iron in blood catalyses the luminescence. The amount of catalyst necessary to cause the reaction is very small relative to the amount of luminol, allowing detection of even trace amounts of blood. The blue glow lasts for about 30 seconds per application. Detecting the glow requires a fairly dark room. Any glow detected may be documented by a long-exposure photograph.

=== Drawbacks ===
The usage of luminol in a crime scene investigation is somewhat hampered by the fact that it reacts to iron- and copper-containing compounds, bleaches, horseradish, fecal matter, and cigarette smoke residue. Application of luminol to a piece of evidence may prevent other tests from being performed on it; however, DNA has been successfully extracted from samples exposed to luminol.

== Related molecules ==
- Luminol: 5-amino-2,3-dihydro-1,4 ; 3-amino-phthalhydrazide ; 1,4-phthalazinedione, 5-amino-2,3-dihydro ; CAS: [521-31-3]
  C_{8}H_{7}N_{3}O_{2} – MW: 177.16
  λ_{abs} (in 0.1 N NaOH) λ_{max} 1 : 347 nm & λ_{max} 2 : 300 nm; EC (at λ_{max} 1): 7650 L/mol × cm
  λ_{abs} / λ_{em} (MeOH): 355/413 nm
- Luminol, sodium salt: sodium 3-amino-phthalhydrazide; CAS: [20666-12-0]
  C_{8}H_{6}N_{3}O_{2}Na – MW: 199.12
- Luminol hemihydrate: a hydrate of sodium 3-amino-phthalhydrazide; CAS: [206658-90-4]
  C_{8}H_{6}N_{3}O_{2}Na · H_{2}O – MW: 217.16
- Luminol hydrochloride: 3-amino-phthalhydrazide hydrochloride; CAS: [74165-64-3]
  C_{8}H_{7}N_{3}O_{2} · HCl MW: 213.62
- Isoluminol: 4-aminophthalhydrazide; CAS: [3682-14-1]
  C_{8}H_{7}N_{3}O_{2} – MW: 117.16 (Xi)
- Isoluminol monohydrate: 4-aminophthalhydrazide monohydrate
  C_{8}H_{7}N_{3}O_{2} · H_{2}O – MW: 195.15
- Isoluminol ABEI: 4-aminophthalhydrazide monohydrate; CAS: [66612-29-1]

== See also ==
- Fluorescein
- Diphenyl oxalate
