= Sommelet–Hauser rearrangement =

New alkyl group

The Sommelet–Hauser rearrangement (named after M. Sommelet and Charles R. Hauser) is a rearrangement reaction of certain benzyl quaternary ammonium salts. The reagent is sodium amide or another alkali metal amide and the reaction product a N,N-dialkylbenzylamine with a new alkyl group in the aromatic ortho position. For example, benzyltrimethylammonium iodide, [(C_{6}H_{5}CH_{2})N(CH_{3})_{3}]I, rearranges in the presence of sodium amide to yield the o-methyl derivative of N,N-dimethylbenzylamine. Although the appearance is of one of the methyl groups migrating off the trimethylammonium group, the process is actually the a pericyclic reaction in which the nitrogen and its three methyl substituents migrate.

== Mechanism ==
The benzylic methylene proton is acidic and deprotonation takes place to produce the benzylic ylide (1). This ylide is in equilibrium with a second ylide that is formed by deprotonation of one of the ammonium methyl groups (2). Though the second ylide is present in much smaller amounts, it undergoes a 2,3-sigmatropic rearrangement because it is more reactive than the first one and undergoes subsequent aromatization to form the final product (3).

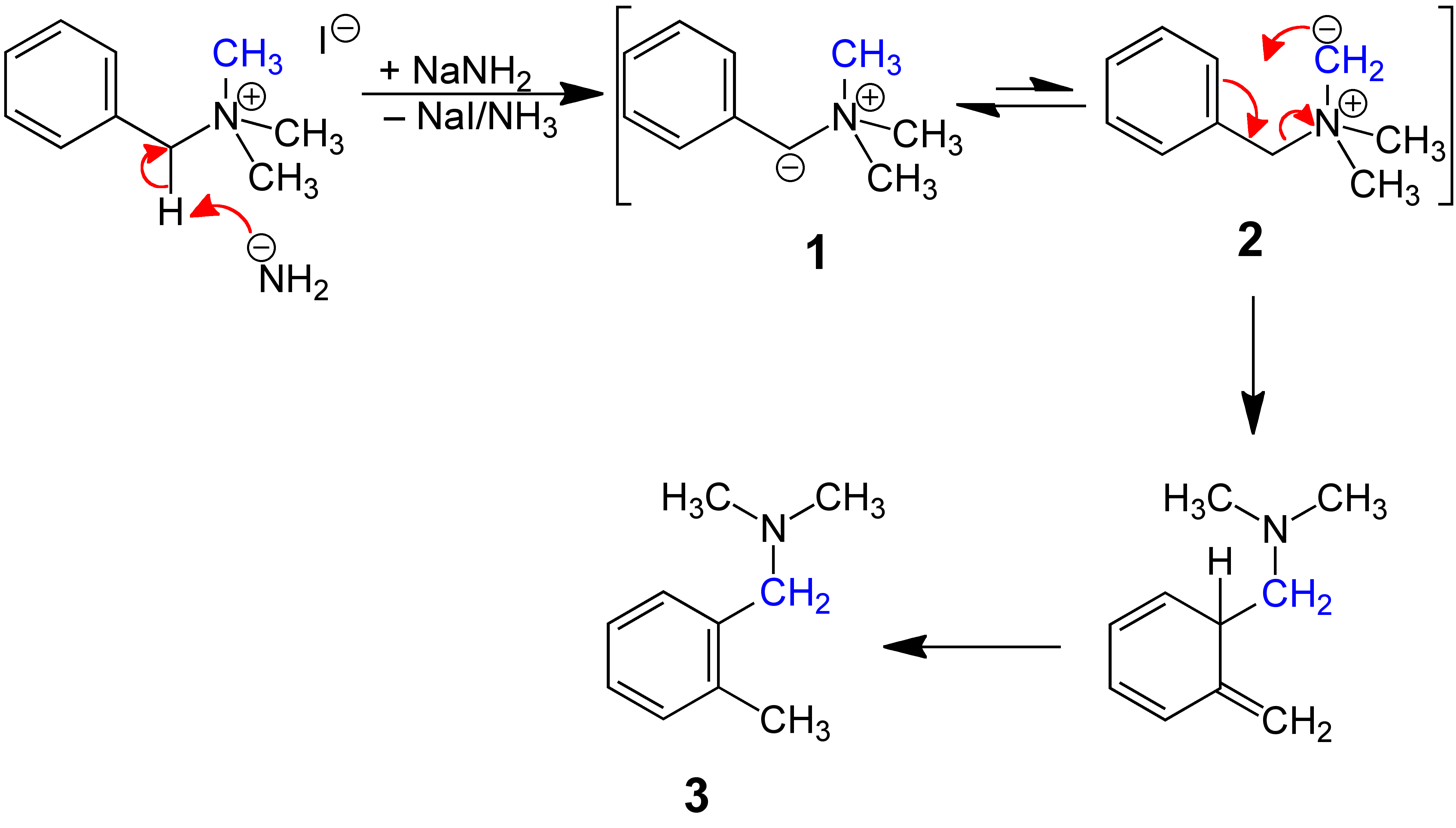

The Stevens rearrangement is a competing reaction.
