= Amidosulfite =

Chemical compound containing the group NS(O)O-

General chemical structure of an amidosulfite

Amidosulfites are chemical compounds containing the group =NS(O)O-. Substituents can attach two bonds to the nitrogen and one to the oxygen. These have the form RR'NS(O)OR" compounds can be a zwitterion with a positive charge on the nitrogen, and a negative charge on the oxygen, which then has no group attached. These can be called inner salts. This allows three groups to bond to the nitrogen: RR'R"N^{+}S(O)O^{−}.

Chemical structure of amidosulfurous acid

The simplest amidosulfite is amidosulfurous acid H_{2}NS(O)OH. It has ammonium salt H_{2}NS(O)O^{−}NH_{4}^{+}. These are purportedly produced when sulfur dioxide mixes with ammonia in ratios 1:1 or 1:2.

Known compounds include N-(2-dimethylammonio-ethyl)amidosulfite, N-(2-diethylammonio-ethyl)amidosulfite, N-[2-(1-Piperidinium-1-yl)-ethyl]amidosulfite, N-[2-(4-Morpholinium-4-yl)-ethyl]amidosulfite, sodium N-ethylamidosulfite (C_{2}H_{5}NHS(O)ONa), Ethyl N-ethylamidosulfite (C_{2}H_{5}NHS(O)OC_{2}H_{5}), diethyl-phosphanyl N-methylamidosulfite, diphenyl-phosphanyl N-methylamidosulfite, N,N-dimethylamidosulfurous acid, N,N-diethylamidosulfurous acid, N,N-bis(2-hydroxyethyl)diethylamidosulfurous acid, sodium N,N-dimethylamidosulfite, sodium N,N-diethylamidosulfite, lithium N,N-diethylamidosulfite, lithium N-hexafluoroisopropylideneamidosulfite (with double bond to nitrogen), sodium 1-piperidinesulfinate Na(CH_{2})_{5}NHS(O)O.

Organometallic substituents can produce for example trimethylsilyl N,N-diethylamidosulfite, trimethyltin N,N-dimethylamidosulfite, or dimethylthallium N,N-dimethylamidosulfite.
