= Anti-fungal =

Anti-fungal means to kill or to prevent growth of fungi, and may refer to:

- Antifungal medication, used to treat or prevent fungal infections
- Fungicide, an anti-fungal substance that kills fungi
- Fungistatics, anti-fungal substances that prevent fungi from growing or reproducing

== See also ==
- Antifungal protein family
