= Charles R. Hauser =

American chemist

- Born: March 8, 1900
- Died: January 6, 1970 (aged 69)
- Scientific career
- Fields: Chemistry

Charles Roy Hauser (March 8, 1900 – January 6, 1970) was an American chemist. Hauser was a member of the National Academy of Sciences and a professor of chemistry at Duke University.

== Notable work ==
The Sommelet–Hauser rearrangement is a named reaction based on the work of Hauser and Sommelet involving the rearrangement of certain benzyl quaternary ammonium salts. The reagent is sodium amide or another alkali metal amide and the reaction product a N,N-dialkylbenzylamine with a new alkyl group in the aromatic ortho position. For example, benzyltrimethylammonium iodide, [(C_{6}H_{5}CH_{2})N(CH_{3})_{3}]I, rearranges in the presence of sodium amide to yield the o-methyl derivative of N,N-dimethylbenzylamine.

== Awards ==
His contributions were recognized by the following awards:

- 1957 the Florida Section Award
- 1962 the Herty Medal
- 1967 the Medal for Synthetic Organic Chemistry from the Synthetic Organic Chemical Manufacturers' Association
