= Nitrile ylide =

Organic compound

Nitrile ylides also known as nitrilium ylides or nitrilium methylides, are generally reactive intermediates formally consisting of a carbanion of an alkyl or similar group bonded to the nitrogen atom of a cyanide unit. With a few exceptions, they cannot be isolated. However, a structure has been determined on a particularly stable nitrile ylide by X-ray crystallography. Another nitrile ylide has been captured under cryogenic conditions.

As ylides, they possess a negative charge and a positive charge on adjacent atoms. However, they also have resonance, including 1,3-dipole contributing structures:

The most appropriate resonance structure is dependent upon the substituent pattern (the identity of the R and R′ groups). The 3-dimensional structure of the nitrilium ylide itself may also provide a clue as to the most appropriate resonance structure, with a linear R–C≡N–C unit supportive of the charge distribution indicated for resonance structures 1a & 1b and also consistent with the nomenclature nitrilium ylide. As resonance structures 1c and 1d become more important the nitrilium ylide distorts its geometry from linear in favor of a different valence tautomer 2 that is distinctly bent:

Nitrile ylides are isoelectronic with nitrile oxides:
$$\ce{R-C#}\overset{\oplus}\ce{N}\ce{-O^\ominus}$$

== Generation ==
Nitrile ylides can be obtained by the addition of electrophilic carbenes to nitriles, by the photochemical ring opening of azirines and by dehydrochlorination of imidoyl chlorides. The latter is the most reliable method.

== Reaction ==
The synthetically most useful reaction of the nitrile ylides is the 1,3-dipolar cycloaddition to dipolarophiles: with electron-deficient alkenes, good yields of pyrrolines are obtained. Alkynes, carbonyl compounds, imines and azirines can also act as dipolarophile. Nitrile ylides react with weak acids like methanol by protonation finally leading to a methoxyimine.
