= Nitrilimine =

Nitrilimines or nitrile amides are a class of organic compounds sharing a common functional group with the general structure R−CN−NR corresponding to the conjugate base of an amine bonded to the N-terminus of a nitrile. The dominant structure for the parent compound nitrilimine is that of the propargyl-like 1 in scheme 1 with a C–N triple bond and with a formal positive charge on nitrogen and two lone pairs and a formal negative charge on the terminal nitrogen. Other structures such as hypervalent 2, allene-like 3, allylic 4 and carbene 5 are of lesser relevance.

$\ce{H-\!{\equiv}}{\color{Blue}\ce{N+}}\!{-}\!{\color{Red}\ce{N-}}\!{-}\!{\color{Red}\ce H}$ 1	$\ce{H-\!{\equiv}N=N-H}$ 2	$\ce H\!{-}\!{\color{Red} \ce{C-}}\!{=}{\color{Blue}\ce{N+}}\!\ce{=N-H}$ 3	$\ce H\!{-}\!{\color{Blue} \ce{C+}}\!\ce{=N}\!{-}\!{\color{Red}\ce{N-}}\!\ce{-H}$ 4	$\ce{H-C{:}\!-N=N-H}$ 5

Nitrilimines were first observed in the thermal decomposition of 2-tetrazoles releasing nitrogen:

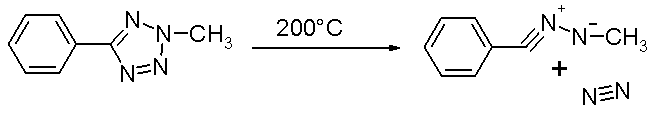
Scheme 2. Nitrilimine formation

6

One alternative synthesis technique is an elimination reaction of hydrazoyl halides.

Nitrilimines are linear 1,3-dipoles represented by structures 1 and 3. A major use is in heterocyclic synthesis. E.g. with alkynes they generate pyrazoles in a 1,3-dipolar cycloaddition. Due to their high energy, they are usually generated in situ as a reactive intermediate.
