= 1,3-dipole =

Dipolar compound with electron delocalization and charge separation over 3 atoms

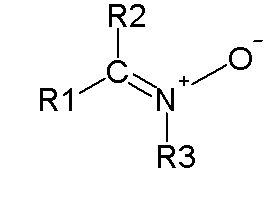

From top to bottom,
azides, nitrones, and
nitro compounds are
examples of 1,3-dipoles.

In organic chemistry, a 1,3-dipolar compound or 1,3-dipole is a dipolar compound with delocalized electrons and a separation of charge over three atoms, as follows: the dipole has at least one resonance structure with positive and negative charges having a 1,3 relationship which can generally be denoted as ^{+}a−b−c^{−}, where a may be a carbon, oxygen or nitrogen, b may be nitrogen or oxygen, and c may be a carbon, oxygen or nitrogen.

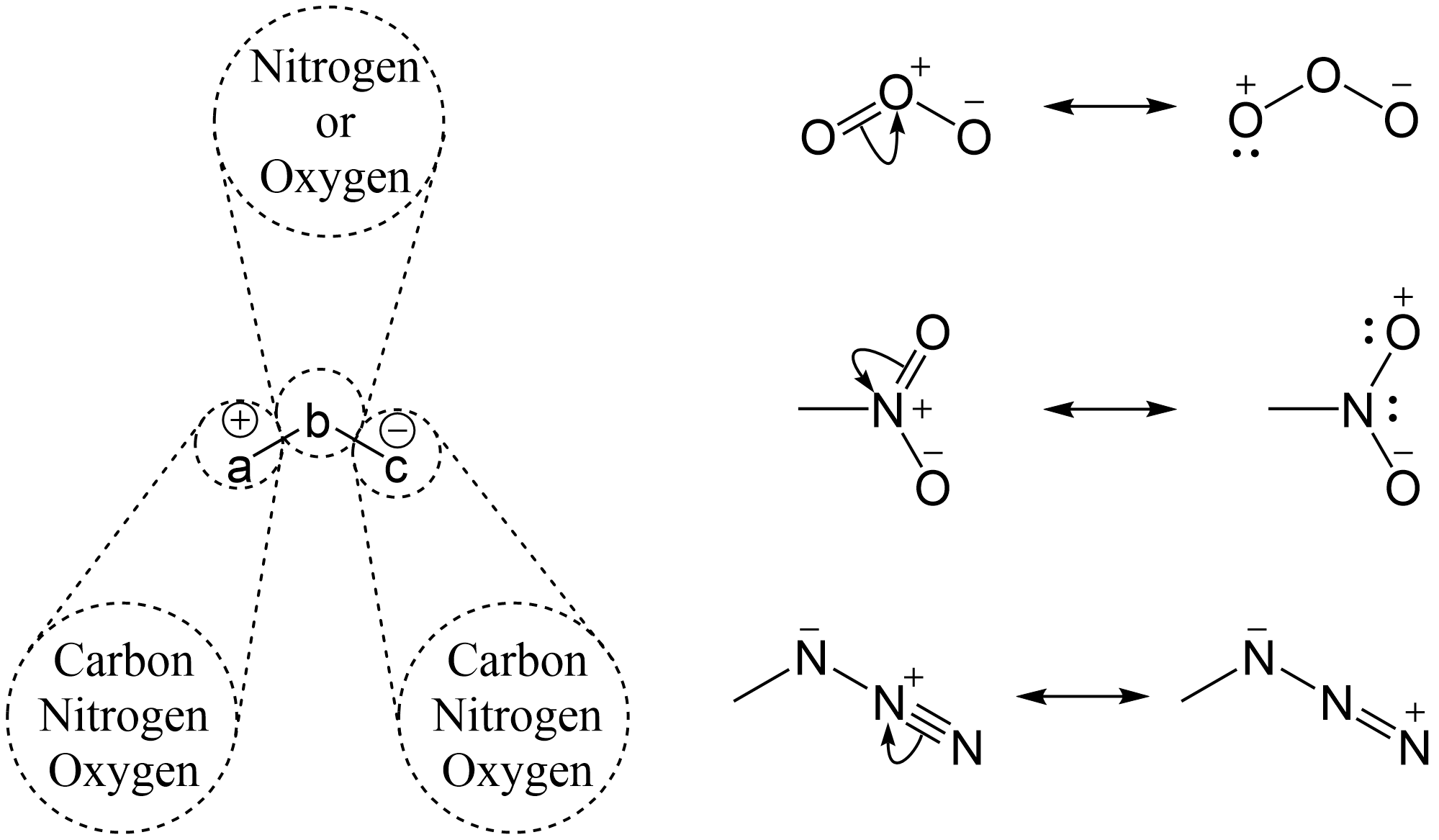
A demonstration that how some well known 1,3-dipoles like ozone, nitro compounds and azides can be shown to have a resonance structure having 1,3 relationship between positive and negative formal charges

They are reactants in 1,3-dipolar cycloadditions.

Known 1,3-dipoles are:

- Azides (RN_{3})
- Ozone (O_{3})
- Nitro compounds (RNO_{2})
- Diazo compounds (R_{2}CN_{2})
- Some oxides
  - Azoxide compounds (RN(O)NR)
  - Carbonyl oxides (Criegee zwitterions)
  - Nitrile oxides (RCN−O)
  - Nitrous oxide (N_{2}O)
  - Nitrones (R_{2}CN(R)O)

Carbonyl oxide

- Some imines:
  - Azomethine imine
  - Nitrilimines (RCN−NR, analogous to nitrile oxide)
  - Carbonyl imines
- Some ylides
  - Azomethine ylide
  - Nitrile ylide (RCNCR'_{2})
  - Carbonyl ylide
  - Thiosulfines (R_{2}CSS)
