= Zwitterion =

Molecule containing an equal number of positive and negative functional groups

In chemistry, a zwitterion (/ˈtsvɪtərˌaɪɒn/ TSVIT-ər-EYE-on; from German Zwitter [ˈtsvɪtɐ] 'hermaphrodite' + Ion), also called an inner salt or dipolar ion is a molecule that contains an equal number of positively and negatively charged functional groups. (1,2-dipolar compounds, such as ylides, are sometimes excluded from the definition.)

Some zwitterions, such as amino acid zwitterions, are in chemical equilibrium with an uncharged "parent" molecule. Betaines are zwitterions that cannot isomerize to an all-neutral form, such as when the positive charge is located on a quaternary ammonium group. Similarly, a molecule containing a phosphonium group and a carboxylate group cannot isomerize.

Because tautomers are different compounds, they have distinct structures. By detecting each, the equilibrium between the zwitterion and its uncharged tautomer can be assessed.

== Examples ==
An amino acid

Sulfamic acid isomers, with the zwitterion (right)

Anthranilic acid

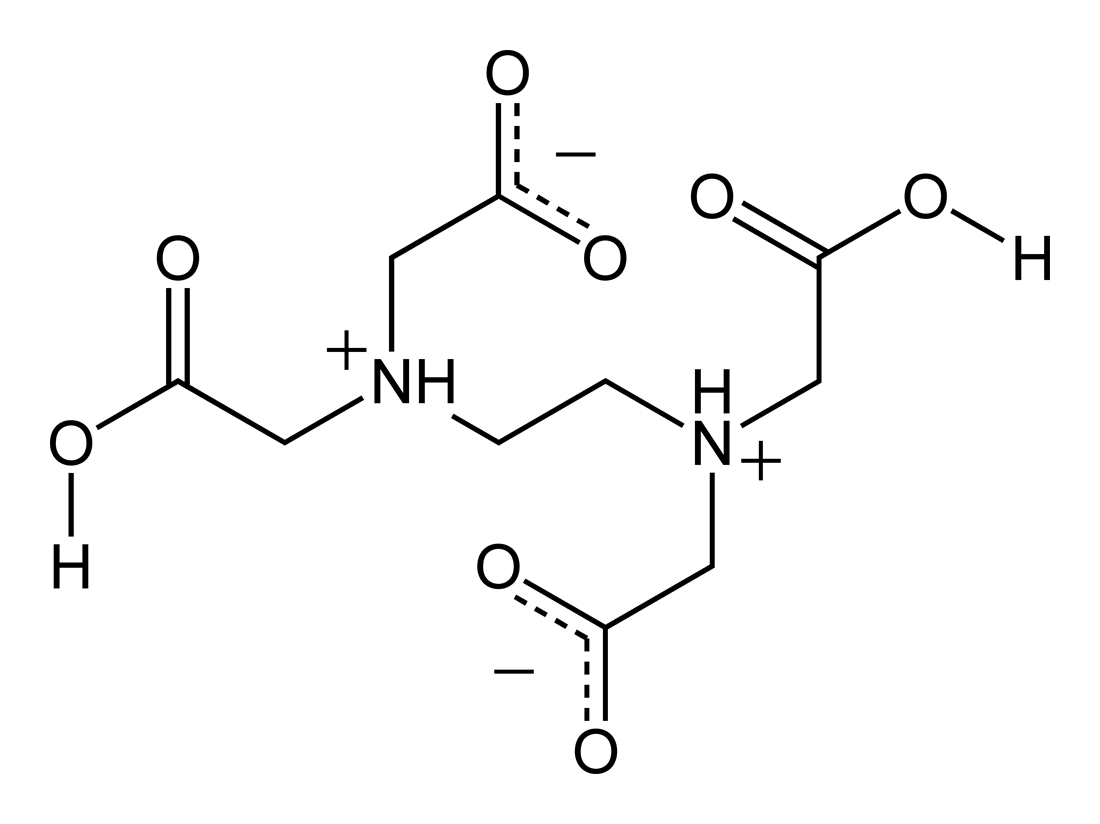
Structure of H_{4}EDTA

Sulfamic acid crystallizes in the zwitterion form.

In crystals of anthranilic acid there are two molecules in the unit cell. One molecule is in the zwitterion form, the other is not.

In the solid state, H_{4}EDTA is a zwitterion with two protons having been transferred from carboxylic acid groups to the nitrogen atoms.

== Case studies ==
pyridoxal phosphate

Vitamin B6, also known as pyridoxal phosphate, exists as the zwitterion in aqueous solution.

=== Amino acids ===
The amino acids are a particularly important family of zwitterions. The zwitterions arise by tautomerism, which follows this stoichiometry:

RCH(NH_{2})CO_{2}H ⇌ RCH(N^{+}H_{3})CO^{−}_{2}

The ratio of the concentrations of the two species in solution is independent of pH. The zwitterionic form in the solid state is stabilized by hydrogen bonds. Zwitterions may also be present in the gas phase for some cases different from the simple carboxylic acid-to-amine transfer.

=== Betaines and similar compounds ===
The compound trimethylglycine, named as "betaine", contain the same structural motif, a quaternary nitrogen atom with a carboxylate group attached to it via a –CH_{2}– link. All compounds whose structure includes this motif are known as betaines. Betaines do not isomerize because the chemical groups attached to the nitrogen atom are not labile. These compounds may be classed as permanent zwitterions, as isomerisation to a molecule with no electrical charges does not occur, or is very slow.

Other examples of permanent zwitterions include phosphatidylcholines, which also contain a quaternary nitrogen atom, but with a negatively-charged phosphate group in place of a carboxylate group; sulfobetaines, which contain a quaternary nitrogen atom and a negatively charged sulfonate group; and pulmonary surfactants such as dipalmitoylphosphatidylcholine. Lauramidopropyl betaine is the major component of cocamidopropyl betaine.

Trimethylglycine (trivial name betaine)

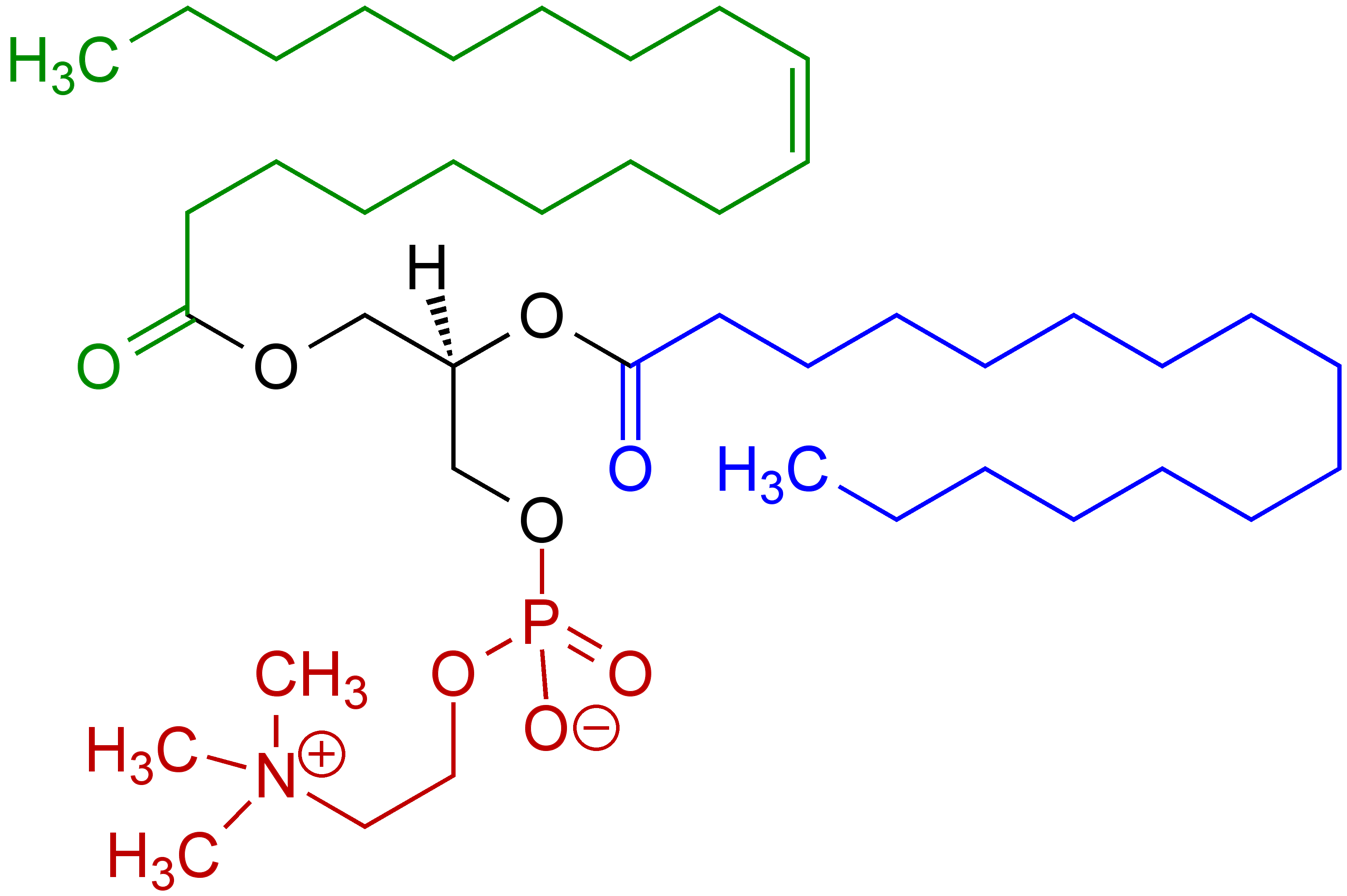
Example of a phosphatidylcholine

cocamidopropyl betaine

=== Nucleotides ===
Containing both amines or imines and phosphoric acid groups, the nucleotides such as AMP, ADP, and ATP exist significantly as zwitterions, although the positive and negative charges are not necessarily balanced.

== Conjugated zwitterions ==
Strongly polarized conjugated compounds (conjugated zwitterions) are typically very reactive, share diradical character, activate strong bonds and small molecules, and serve as transient intermediates in catalysis. Donor-acceptor entities are of vast use in photochemistry (photoinduced electron transfer), organic electronics, switching and sensing.

== See also ==
- Amphoterism
- Azomethine ylide
