= Antifungal protein family =

Antifungal_prot
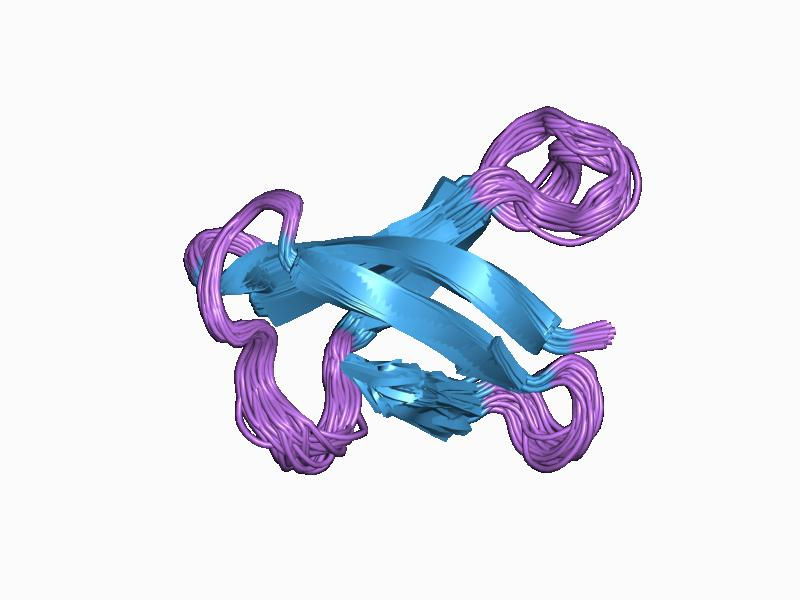
- solution structure of the antifungal protein from aspergillus giganteus. evidence for disulphide configurational isomerism

Identifiers
- Symbol: Antifungal_prot
- Pfam: PF11402
- InterPro: IPR022706
Available protein structures:
- PDB: IPR022706 PF11402 (ECOD; PDBsum)
- AlphaFold: IPR022706; PF11402

The antifungal protein family is a protein family, with members sharing a structure consisting of five antiparallel beta strands which are highly twisted creating a beta barrel stabilised by four internal disulphide bridges. A cationic site adjacent to a hydrophobic stretch on the protein surface may constitute a phospholipid binding site.

== Penicillium ==
PAF (Q01701) and PAFB (D0EXD3) are two members of PF11402 from Penicillium chrysogenum. PAF exhibits growth-inhibitory activity against a broad range of filamentous fungi. Evidence suggests that disruption of Ca^{2+} signaling/homeostasis plays an important role in the mechanistic basis of PAF as a growth inhibitor. PAF also elicits hyperpolarization of the plasma membrane and the activation of ion channels, followed by an increase in reactive oxygen species in the cell and the induction of an apoptosis-like phenotype

PAF and PAFB are well-tolerated by mammalian and plant cells. They have proposed uses in medicine.

== In humans ==
Human epithelium produces antifungal protein S100A7, which is not a member of this protein family. Instead, S100A7 belongs in the S100 protein family. The proteins kill fungi by inducing apoptosis and/or forming pores on the cell membrane.
