= Dimethylbenzylamine =

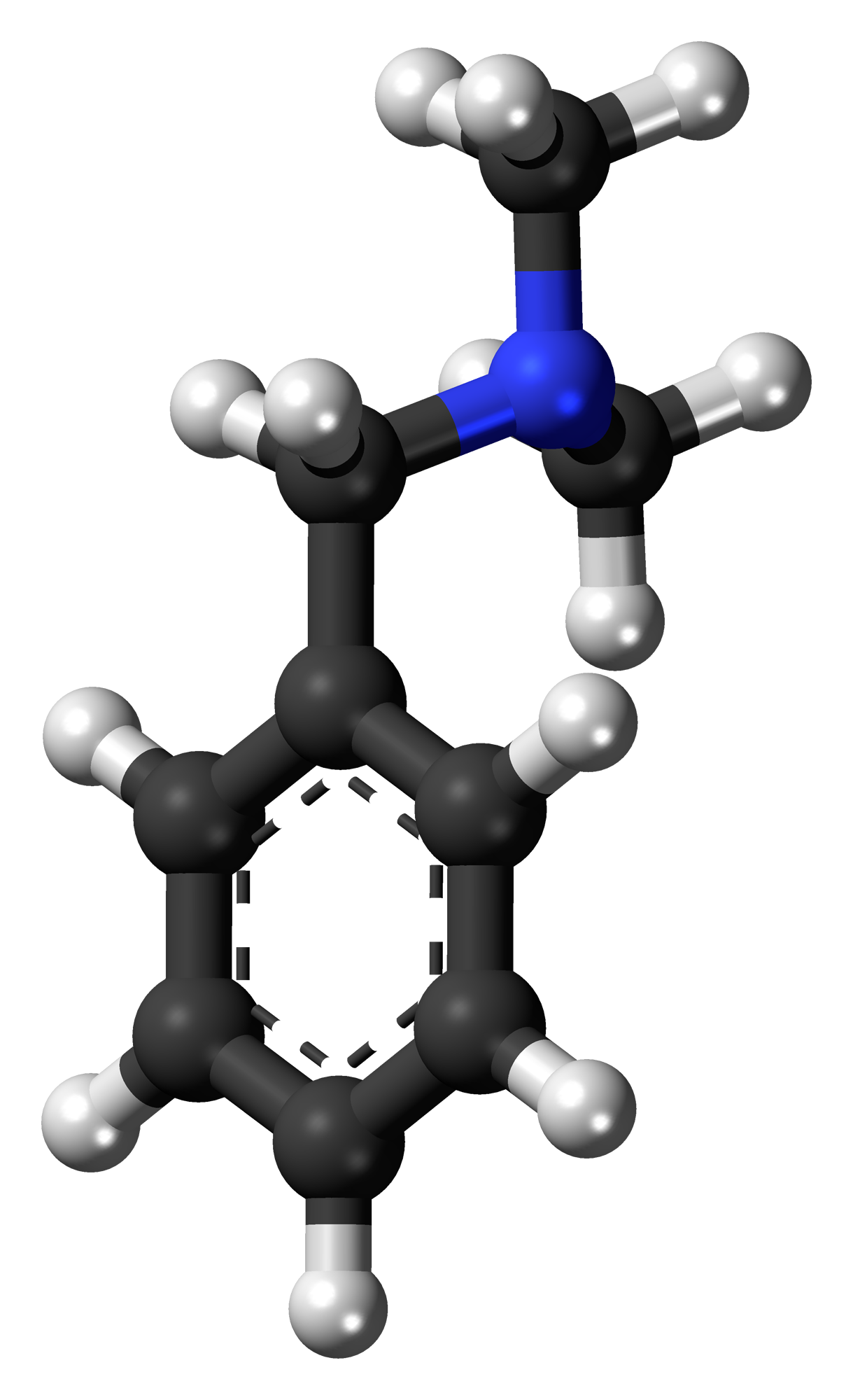

Names
- Preferred IUPAC name N,N-Dimethyl-1-phenylmethanamine
- Other names N,N-Dimethylbenzenemethanamine, N,N-Dimethylbenzylamine, N-Benzyldimethylamine, Dimethylbenzylamine, Benzyl-N,N-dimethylamine, N-(Phenylmethyl)dimethylamine, BDMA, Sumine 2015, Benzenemethanamine, Dabco B-16, Araldite accelerator 062, N,N-Dimethyl(phenyl)methanamine, DMBA

Identifiers
CAS Number	103-83-3
3D model (JSmol)	Interactive image
ChEMBL	ChEMBL45591
ChemSpider	7398
ECHA InfoCard	100.002.863
EC Number	203-149-1
PubChem CID	7681
RTECS number	DP4500000
UNII	TYP7AXQ1YJ
UN number	2619
CompTox Dashboard (EPA)	DTXSID8021854
- InChI: InChI=1S/C9H13N/c1-10(2)8-9-6-4-3-5-7-9/h3-7H,8H2,1-2H3 Key: XXBDWLFCJWSEKW-UHFFFAOYSA-N; InChI=1/C9H13N/c1-10(2)8-9-6-4-3-5-7-9/h3-7H,8H2,1-2H3 Key: XXBDWLFCJWSEKW-UHFFFAOYAQ
- SMILES: N(C)(Cc1ccccc1)C

Properties
Chemical formula	C_{9}H_{13}N
Molar mass	135.210 g·mol^{−1}
Appearance	colourless liquid
Density	0.91 g/cm^{3} at 20 °C
Melting point	−75 °C (−103 °F; 198 K)
Boiling point	180 to 183 °C (356 to 361 °F; 453 to 456 K)
Solubility in water	1.2 g/100mL

Hazards
- GHS labelling
Pictograms	(GHS02: Flammable) (GHS05: Corrosive) (GHS07: Exclamation mark)
Signal word	Danger
Hazard statements	H226, H302, H312, H314, H332, H412
Precautionary statements	P210, P233, P240, P241, P242, P243, P260, P264, P270, P271, P273, P280, P301+P312, P301+P330+P331, P302+P352, P303+P361+P353, P304+P312, P304+P340, P305+P351+P338, P310, P312, P321, P322, P330, P363, P370+P378, P403+P235, P405, P501
NFPA 704 (fire diamond)	3 3 0
Flash point	55 °C (131 °F; 328 K)
Autoignition temperature	410 °C (770 °F; 683 K)
- Except where otherwise noted, data are given for materials in their standard state (at 25 °C [77 °F], 100 kPa). verify (what is ?) Infobox references

Dimethylbenzylamine is the organic compound with the formula C_{6}H_{5}CH_{2}N(CH_{3})_{2}. The molecule consists of a benzyl group, C_{6}H_{5}CH_{2}, attached to a dimethylamino functional group. It is a colorless liquid. It is used as a catalyst for the formation of polyurethane foams and epoxy resins.

== Synthesis ==
N,N-Dimethylbenzylamine can be synthesized by the Eschweiler–Clarke reaction of benzylamine

== Reactions ==
It undergoes directed ortho metalation with butyl lithium:

[C_{6}H_{5}CH_{2}N(CH_{3})_{2} + BuLi → 2-LiC_{6}H_{4}CH_{2}N(CH_{3})_{2}
LiC_{6}H_{4}CH_{2}N(CH_{3})_{2} + E^{+} → 2-EC_{6}H_{4}CH_{2}N(CH_{3})_{2}

Via these reactions, many derivatives are known with the formula 2-X-C_{6}H_{4}CH_{2}N(CH_{3})_{2} (E = SR, PR_{2}, etc.).

The amine is basic and undergoes quaternization with alkyl halides (e.g. hexyl bromide) to give quaternary ammonium salts:

[C_{6}H_{5}CH_{2}N(CH_{3})_{2} + RX → [C_{6}H_{5}CH_{2}N(CH_{3})_{2}R]^{+}X^{−}

Such salts are useful phase transfer catalysts.

== Uses ==
As the molecule has tertiary amine functionality, two of the key uses are as an epoxy-amine cure enhancement catalyst and also as a polyurethane catalyst.
