= C2H2N2O =

The molecular formula C_{2}H_{2}N_{2}O (molar mass: 70.05 g/mol, exact mass: 70.0167 u) may refer to:

- Oxadiazoles
  - Furazan (1,2,5-oxadiazole)
  - 1,3,4-Oxadiazole
