= Azole =

Class of heterocyclic compounds

Azoles are a class of five-membered heterocyclic compounds containing a nitrogen atom and at least one other non-carbon atom (i.e. nitrogen, sulfur, or oxygen) as part of the ring. Their names originate from the Hantzsch–Widman nomenclature. The parent compounds are aromatic and have two double bonds; there are successively reduced analogs (azolines and azolidines) with fewer. One, and only one, lone pair of electrons from each heteroatom in the ring is part of the aromatic bonding in an azole. Names of azoles maintain the prefix upon reduction (e.g., pyrazoline, pyrazolidine). The numbering of ring atoms in azoles starts with the heteroatom that is not part of a double bond, and then proceeds towards the other heteroatom.

Imidazole and other five-membered aromatic heterocyclic systems with two nitrogens are extremely common in nature and form the core of many biomolecules, such as histidine.

== Compound classes ==
Nitrogen only

Imidazole

Pyrazole

1,2,3-Triazole

1,2,4-Triazole

Tetrazole

Pentazole

N,O compounds

Oxazole

Isoxazole

1,2,3-oxadiazole
(unstable)

Oxadiazole
(1,2,4-Oxadiazole)

Furazan
(1,2,5-oxadiazole)

1,3,4-Oxadiazole

N,S compounds

Thiazole

Isothiazole

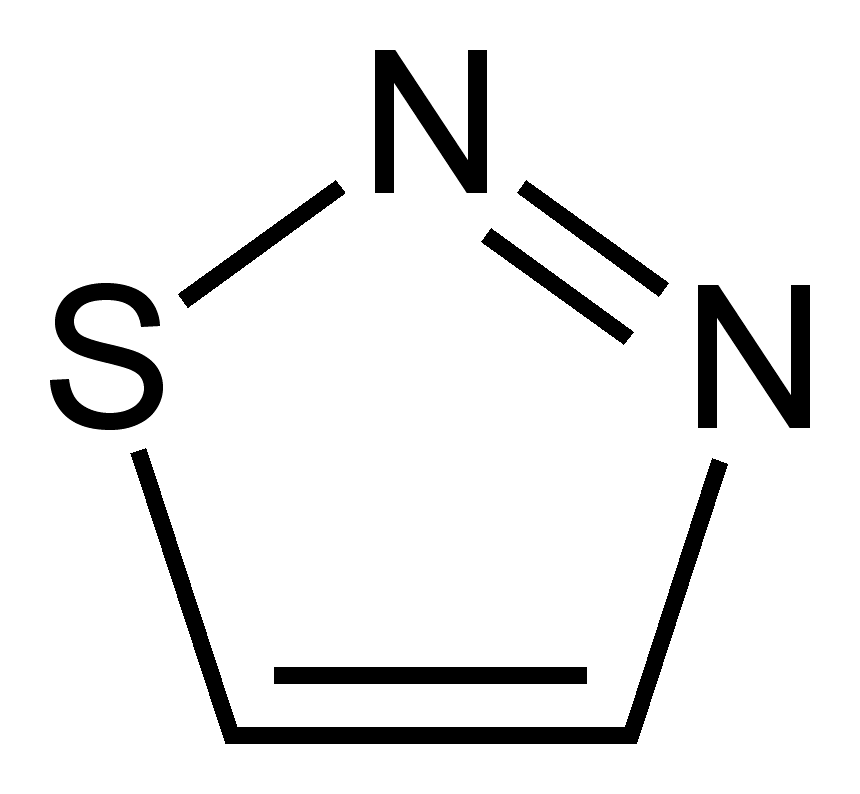
Thiadiazole
(1,2,3-Thiadiazole)

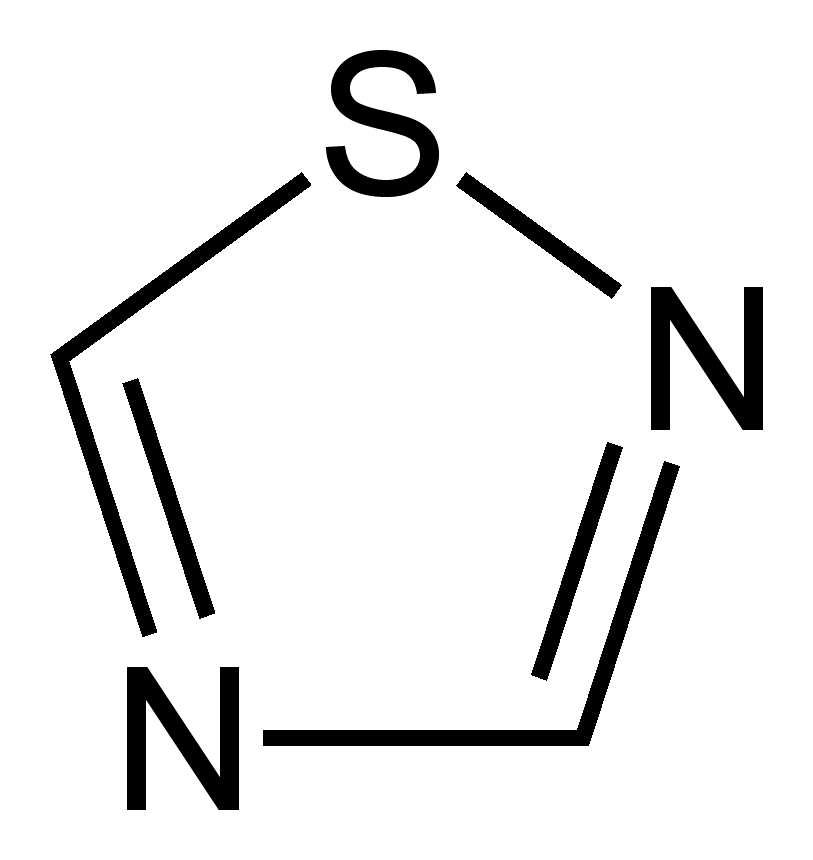
1,2,4-thiadiazole

1,2,5-thiadiazole

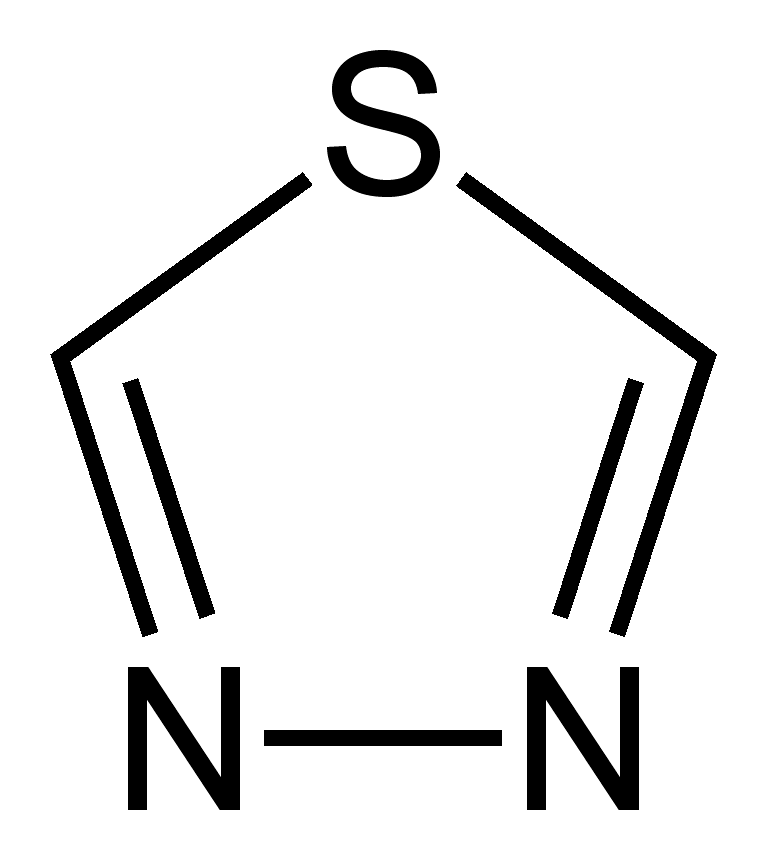
1,3,4-thiadiazole

== Use as antifungal agents ==
Skeletal formula of fluconazole - an antifungal medication

The search for antifungal agents with acceptable toxicity profiles led first to the discovery of ketoconazole, the first azole-based oral treatment of systemic fungal infections, in the early 1980s. Later, triazoles fluconazole and itraconazole, with a broader spectrum of antifungal activity and improved safety profile were developed. In order to overcome limitations such as sub-optimal spectra of activity, drug-drug interactions, toxicity, development of resistance and unfavorable pharmacokinetics, analogues were developed. Second-generation triazoles, including voriconazole, posaconazole and ravuconazole, are more potent and more active against resistant pathogens.

For wood preservation, other azoles such as propiconazole, tebuconazole and cyproconazole, are used as antifungal agents in several wood products or structures, with or without the addition of copper-containing compounds. Such azoles possess a good activity in solvents and water-based formulations, and are effective against wood-destroying, rot fungi.
