= C2H2N2O2 =

The molecular formula C_{2}H_{2}N_{2}O_{2} (molar mass: 86.05 g/mol, exact mass: 86.0116 u) may refer to:

- Furoxan, or 1,2,5-oxadiazole 2-oxide
- Sydnone
