= Tioxazafen =

Nematicide for crops, marketed as Nemastrike

Names
- Preferred IUPAC name 3-Phenyl-5-(2-thienyl)-1,2,4-oxadiazole
- Other names MON-102100

Identifiers
CAS Number	330459-31-9
3D model (JSmol)	Interactive image
ChEBI	CHEBI:131756
ChemSpider	606158
ECHA InfoCard	100.238.785
PubChem CID	695679
UNII	45442MUI4L
CompTox Dashboard (EPA)	DTXSID10186703
- InChI: InChI=1S/C12H8N2OS/c1-2-5-9(6-3-1)11-13-12(15-14-11)10-7-4-8-16-10/h1-8H/h3-7,18-19H,1,8H2,2H3 Key: IHNSIFFSNUQGQN-UHFFFAOYSA-N
- SMILES: O1N=C(N=C1C=2SC=CC2)C3=CC=CC=C3

Properties
Chemical formula	C_{12}H_{8}N_{2}OS
Molar mass	228.27 g·mol^{−1}
- Except where otherwise noted, data are given for materials in their standard state (at 25 °C [77 °F], 100 kPa). (what is ?) Infobox references

Tioxazafen [ISO] is a seed treatment nematicide developed by Monsanto to provide consistent broad-spectrum control of nematodes in corn, soy, and cotton. Its structure has a disubstituted oxadiazole skeleton, representing a new class of nematicides. Greenhouse and field trials suggest that it is at least as effective as existing commercial nematicides for the control of soybean cyst nematode, root-knot nematode, and reniform nematode.

Tioxazafen is marketed commercially as Nemastrike.
