= Benzotrifuroxan =

Names
- Other names Benzenetrifuroxan

Identifiers
CAS Number	3470-17-5
3D model (JSmol)	Interactive image
ChEMBL	ChEMBL3951400
ChemSpider	17920
PubChem CID	18982
CompTox Dashboard (EPA)	DTXSID8063046
- InChI: InChI=1S/C6N6O6/c13-10-4-1(7-16-10)5-3(8-17-11(5)14)6-2(4)9-18-12(6)15 Key: ROSQKRBIBODSRH-UHFFFAOYSA-N
- SMILES: C12=NO[N+](=C1C3=NO[N+](=C3C4=NO[N+](=C24)[O-])[O-])[O-]

Properties
Chemical formula	C_{6}N_{6}O_{6}
Molar mass	252.102 g·mol^{−1}
- Except where otherwise noted, data are given for materials in their standard state (at 25 °C [77 °F], 100 kPa). Infobox references

Benzotrifuroxan is a heterocyclic organic compound that is related to 1,2,5-oxadioles. The high-energy compound is explosive.

== History ==
The compound was first synthesized in 1924 by O. Turek as hexanitrosobenzene. In addition to the hexanitroso structure, symmetric polycyclic structures could also be formulated.

Historical, non-real structures of benzotrifuroxan

== Characteristics ==
=== Physical properties ===
Benzotrifuroxan is a crystalline solid that melts at 195 °C. The compound crystallizes in an orthorhombic crystal lattice with the space group Pna2_{1}. The molar enthalpy of formation is 606 kJ·mol^{−1}, the enthalpy of combustion is −2967 kJ·mol^{−1}.

=== Chemical properties ===
Benzotrifuroxan can decompose explosively. The heat of explosion is 5903 kJ·kg ^{−1}, the detonation speed is 8.61 km·s ^{−1}. The compound is sensitive to impact.

Benzotrifuroxan forms stable complexes with aromatic hydrocarbons such as naphthalene, 1-phenylnaphthalene, 2-phenylnaphthalene and tetrahydronaphthalene. Recrystallization in benzene yields a 1:1 complex with the solvent, whereby the benzene can only be removed at 100 °C in vacuum.

== Synthesis ==
Benzotrifuroxan can be obtained by thermal degradation of 1,3,5-triazido-2,4,6-trinitrobenzene.

A further synthesis can be carried out by reacting 5,7-dichloro-4,6-dinitronbenzofuroxan with sodium azide.

== Uses ==
In combination with TNT, the compound can be used to produce nanodiamonds using detonation shock waves.
