= Bis-oxadiazole =

Names
- Preferred IUPAC name [3,3′-Bi-1,2,4-oxadiazole]-5,5′-diylbis(methylene) dinitrate
- Other names: Bis(1,2,4-oxadiazole)bis(methylene) dinitrate; Bis-isoxazole-bis-methylene dinitrate; BIDN

Identifiers
3D model (JSmol)	Interactive image
ChemSpider	129558926
PubChem CID	139033609
CompTox Dashboard (EPA)	DTXSID601336410
- InChI: InChI=1S/C6H4N6O8/c13-11(14)17-1-3-7-5(9-19-3)6-8-4(20-10-6)2-18-12(15)16/h1-2H2 Key: AVTVAJHPJUFZPZ-UHFFFAOYSA-N
- SMILES: [O-][N+](=O)OCC1=NC(=NO1)C1=NOC(CO[N+]([O-])=O)=N1

Properties
Chemical formula	C_{6}H_{4}N_{6}O_{8}
Molar mass	288.132 g·mol^{−1}
- Except where otherwise noted, data are given for materials in their standard state (at 25 °C [77 °F], 100 kPa). Infobox references

Bis-oxadiazole, or more formally known as bis(1,2,4-oxadiazole)bis(methylene) dinitrate, is a nitrated heterocyclic compound of the oxadiazole family.

Bis-oxadiazole is related to bis-isoxazole tetranitrate (BITN), which was developed at the United States Army Research Laboratory (ARL). With a high nitrogen content, these compounds are poised to release a large volume of very stable N_{2}. It is a “melt-cast” explosive material that is potentially both more powerful and environmentally friendly alternative to TNT.

== Synthesis ==
Glyoxal condenses with hydroxylamine to yield diaminoglyoxime (DAG). Treating DAG with methyl glycolate in the presence of base at high temperature, followed by nitration, yields bis(1,2,4-oxadiazole).

== Replacement for TNT ==
TNT is attractive explosive because it is a melt-castable. A low melting point of about 80 °C and high decomposition temperature of 295 °C allows manufacturers to safely pour TNT into molds. The production of TNT generates hazardous waste, e.g. red water and pink water.

Bis-oxadiazole, which is also melt-castable, is about 1.5 times more powerful than TNT and yet produces less hazardous wastes.

Physical Properties of Bis-oxadiazole Compared to TNT
Physical Property	bis-oxadiazole	TNT
Onset temperature of melting	84.5 °C	80.4 °C
Onset temperature of decomposition	183.4 °C	295.0 °C
Derived density from X-ray data	1.832 g cm^{−3}	1.65 g cm^{−3}
Detonation pressure	29.4 GPa	20.5 GPa
Detonation velocity	8180 m s^{−1}	6950 m s^{−1}
Molar enthalpy of formation	-79.4 kJ mol^{−1}	-59.3 kJ mol^{−1}

A major challenge in the production of bis-oxadiazole is its low yield.
