= Caesium dodecaborate =

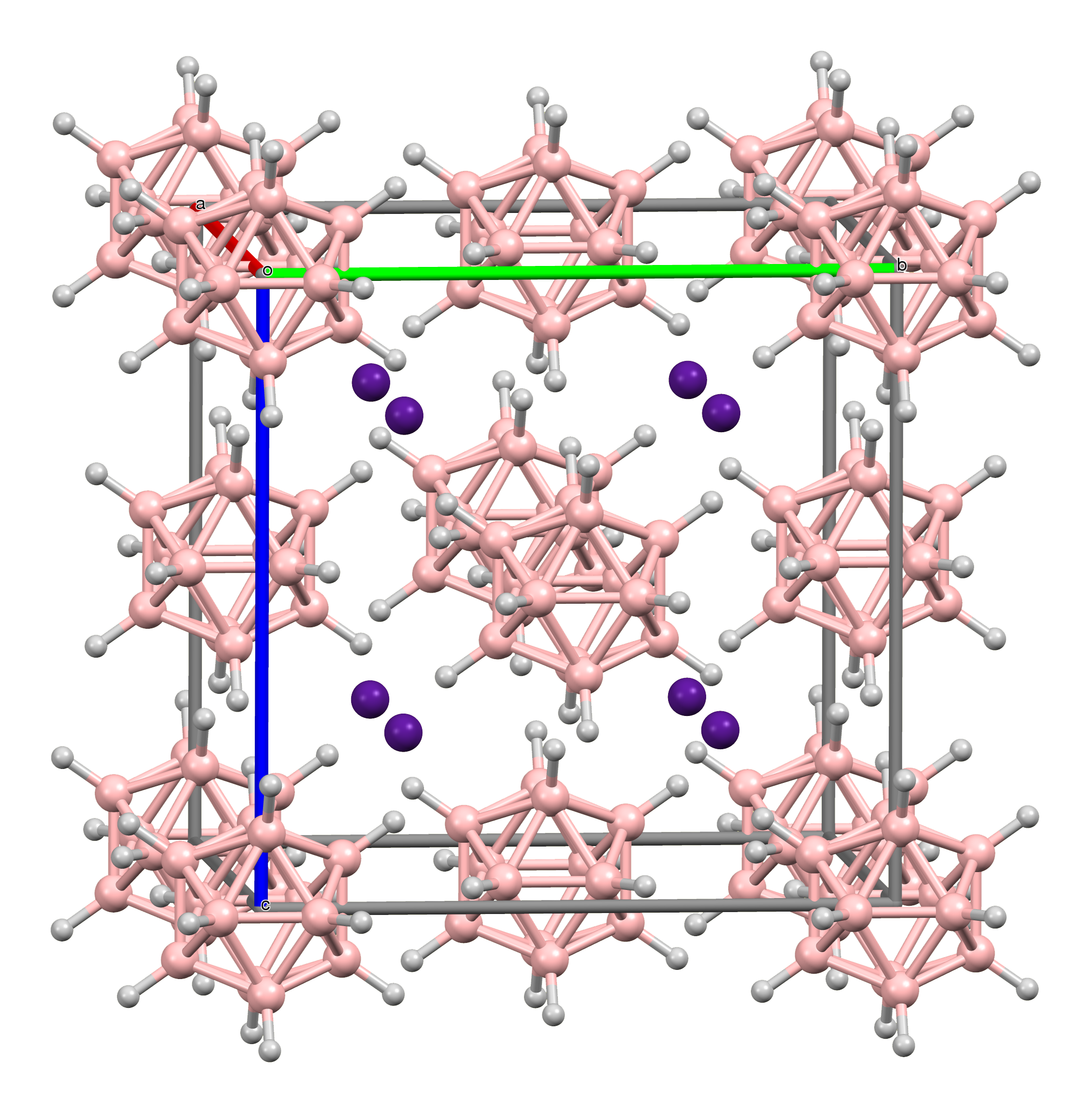

Names
- IUPAC name Caesium dodecaborate

Identifiers
CAS Number	12008-75-2
3D model (JSmol)	Interactive image
EC Number	601-668-1
PubChem CID	71306871
- InChI: InChI=1S/B12H12.2Cs/c1-3-5-7-9-11-12-10-8-6-4-2;;/h1-12H;;/q+2;2*-1 Key: WMUPFLCRVFMECH-UHFFFAOYSA-N
- SMILES: [Cs+].[Cs+].[BH]1234[BH]567[BH]189[BH]2%10%11[BH]8%12%13[BH]%10%14%15[BH]%16%17%18[BH]35([BH]6%16%19[BH]%12%14%17[BH-]79%13%19)[BH-]4%11%15%18

Properties
Chemical formula	B_{12}H_{12}Cs_{2}
Molar mass	407.63 g·mol^{−1}
Appearance	Colourless solid
Melting point	>650 °C
Solubility in water	low
Solubility	good in ethers

Hazards
- Occupational safety and health (OHS/OSH)
Main hazards	flammable
- GHS labelling
Signal word	Danger
Hazard statements	H228, H315, H319, H335
Precautionary statements	P101, P102, P103, P210, P231+P232, P280, P403+P233, P501

Related compounds

Structure
Point group	I_{h}
Dipole moment	0 D
- Except where otherwise noted, data are given for materials in their standard state (at 25 °C [77 °F], 100 kPa). verify (what is ?) Infobox references

Caesium dodecaborate is an inorganic compound with the formula Cs_{2}B_{12}H_{12}. It is a salt composed of caesium and dodecaborate(12) ions. The [B_{12}H_{12}]^{2−} anion has been of great theoretical interest to the chemistry community.

== Structure ==
The [B_{12}H_{12}]^{2−} anion's B_{12} core is a regular icosahedron. The [B_{12}H_{12}]^{2−} as a whole also has icosahedral molecular symmetry, and it belongs to the molecular point group I_{h}. Its icosahedral shape is consistent with the classification of this cage as "closo" in polyhedral skeletal electron pair theory.

Crystals of Cs_{2}B_{12}H_{12} feature Cs^{+} ions in contact with twelve hydrides provided by four B_{12}H_{12}^{2−}. The B-B bond distances are 178 pm, and the B-H distances are 112 pm. Many other salts are known.

== Preparation ==
The dodecaborate anion was first prepared in modest yield by Pitochelli and Hawthorne from iododecarborane. It is more conventienly prepared in two steps from sodium borohydride. First the borohydride is converted into a triborate anion using the etherate of boron trifluoride:

4 NaBH_{4} + BF_{3} → NaB_{3}H_{8} + 3 NaF + 4 H_{2}

Pyrolysis of the triborate gives the twelve boron cluster as the sodium salt, which is then treated with caesium hydroxide to precipitate Cs_{2}B_{12}H_{12}.

== Reactions and proposed applications ==
Salts of B_{12}H_{12}^{2−} have been investigated for boron neutron capture therapy and as fuels for airbags.

Salts of B_{12}H_{12}^{2−} are precursors to related derivatives including B_{12}(OH)_{12}^{2−} and B_{12}(CH_{3})_{12}^{2−}. This closo boron hydride resists degradation more so than the isoelectronic carboranes.

== See also ==
- Neutron capture therapy of cancer
