= 1,3,4-Oxadiazole =

Names
- Preferred IUPAC name 1,3,4-Oxadiazole

Identifiers
| CAS Number | 288-99-3 |
| 3D model (JSmol) | Interactive image |
| ChemSpider | 87937 |
| PubChem CID | 97428 |
| UNII | 20O2F20OUR |
| CompTox Dashboard (EPA) | DTXSID10182987 |
- InChI: InChI=1S/C2H2N2O/c1-3-4-2-5-1/h1-2H Key: FKASFBLJDCHBNZ-UHFFFAOYSA-N
- SMILES: C1=NN=CO1

Properties
| Chemical formula | C_{2}H_{2}N_{2}O |
| Molar mass | 70.051 g·mol^{−1} |
- Except where otherwise noted, data are given for materials in their standard state (at 25 °C [77 °F], 100 kPa). Infobox references

1,3,4-Oxadiazole is a nitrogen and oxygen containing heterocycle, and one of the four isomers of oxadiazole.

== Derivatives ==
1,3,4-Oxadiazole itself is not commonly used in organic chemistry, but many of its derivatives are important. For example, raltegravir is an HIV drug which contains an 1,3,4-oxadiazole ring. Other pharmaceutical drugs containing the 1,3,4-oxadiazole ring include fenadiazole, zibotentan, and tiodazosin.

1,3,4-Oxadiazole derivatives can be synthesized in a variety of ways. One pathway is from oxidation of tetrazoles in the presence of aldehydes. Similarly, the reaction of tetrazoles with acyl chlorides provides oxadiazoles. Both methods involve the release of N_{2}.

== See also ==
- Furazan (1,2,5-oxadiazole)
