= Oxadiazole =

Class of organic compounds

Oxadiazoles are a class of heterocyclic aromatic chemical compounds of the azole family with the molecular formula C_{2}H_{2}N_{2}O. There are four isomers of oxadiazole:

1,2,3-oxadiazole

1,2,4-oxadiazole

1,2,5-oxadiazole
(furazan)

1,3,4-oxadiazole

1,2,4-Oxadiazole, 1,2,5-oxadiazole, and 1,3,4-oxadiazole are all known and appear in a variety of pharmaceutical drugs including raltegravir, butalamine, fasiplon, oxolamine, and pleconaril. The 1,2,3-isomer is unstable and ring-opens to form the diazoketone tautomer; however, it does exist within the unusual sydnone motif.

In 2018, a compound called bis(1,2,4-oxadiazole)bis(methylene) dinitrate which might have 1.5 times the power of TNT was developed at the United States Army Research Laboratory (ARL) working with the Los Alamos National Laboratory.
