= Furoxan =

Names
- Preferred IUPAC name 1,2λ^{5},5-Oxadiazol-2-one
- Other names Furazan N-oxide; Furazan 2-oxide

Identifiers
CAS Number	497-27-8
3D model (JSmol)	Interactive image
ChemSpider	4482868
MeSH	C528141
PubChem CID	5325374
CompTox Dashboard (EPA)	DTXSID80416009
- InChI: InChI=1S/C2H2N2O2/c5-4-2-1-3-6-4/h1-2H Key: KCMCIQNPQUSQKQ-UHFFFAOYSA-N; InChI=1/C2H2N2O2/c5-4-2-1-3-6-4/h1-2H Key: KCMCIQNPQUSQKQ-UHFFFAOYAH
- SMILES: [O-][N+]1=CC=NO1

Properties
Chemical formula	C_{2}H_{2}N_{2}O_{2}
Molar mass	86.050 g·mol^{−1}
- Except where otherwise noted, data are given for materials in their standard state (at 25 °C [77 °F], 100 kPa). verify (what is ?) Infobox references

Furoxan (1,2,5-oxadiazole 2-oxide) is a heterocycle of the isoxazole family and an amine oxide derivative of furazan. It is a nitric oxide donor. As such, furoxan and its derivatives, such as ipramidil, are being actively studied as potential new drugs and insensitive high density explosives (4,4'-Dinitro-3,3'-diazenofuroxan).

Furoxanes can be formed by dimerization of nitrile oxides.
