= Furazan =

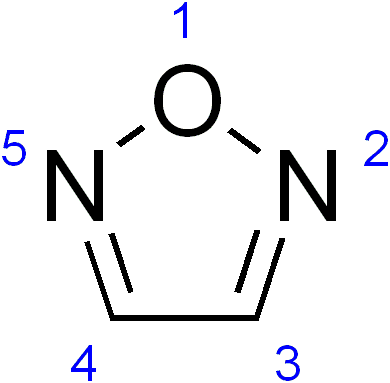

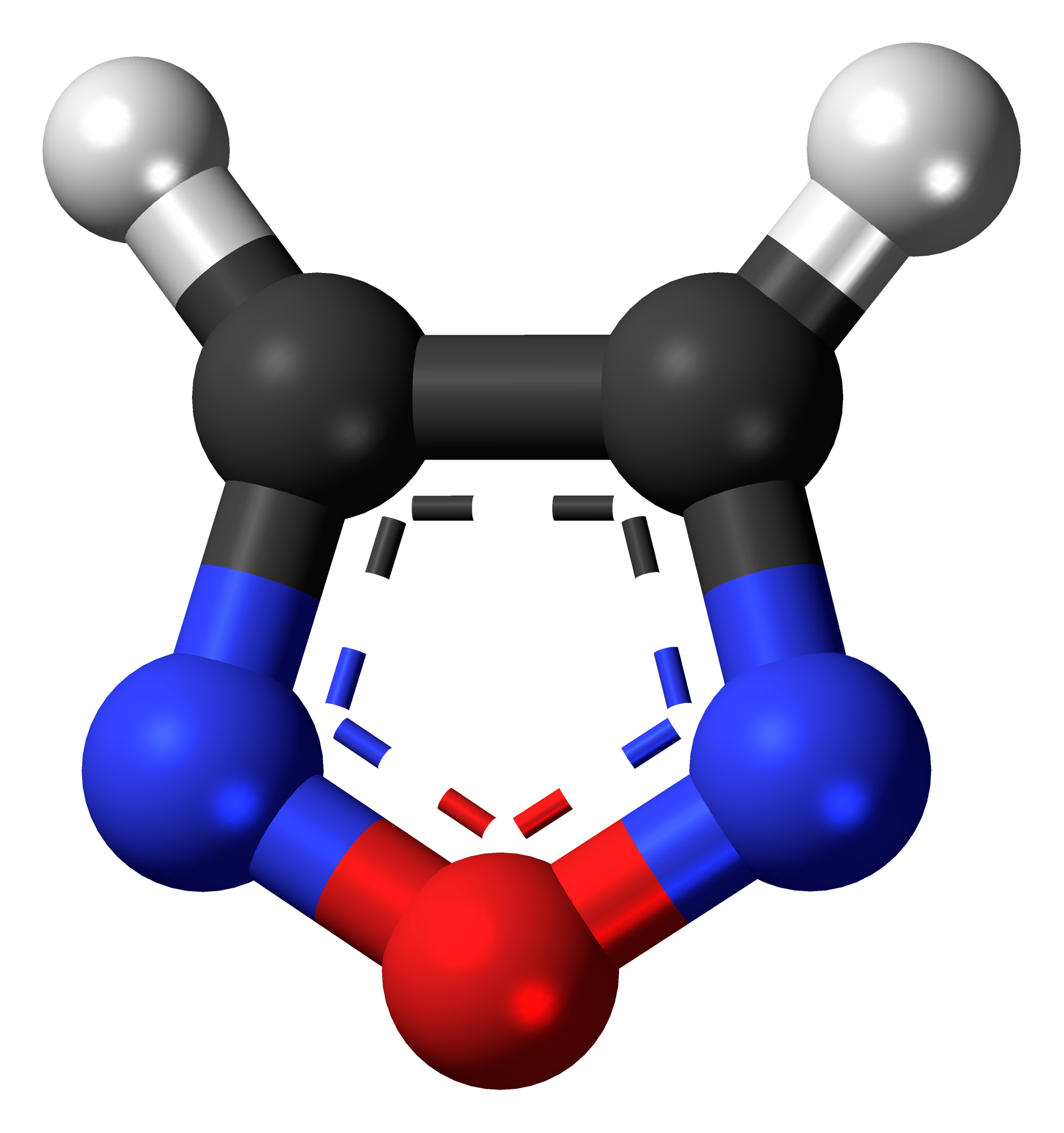

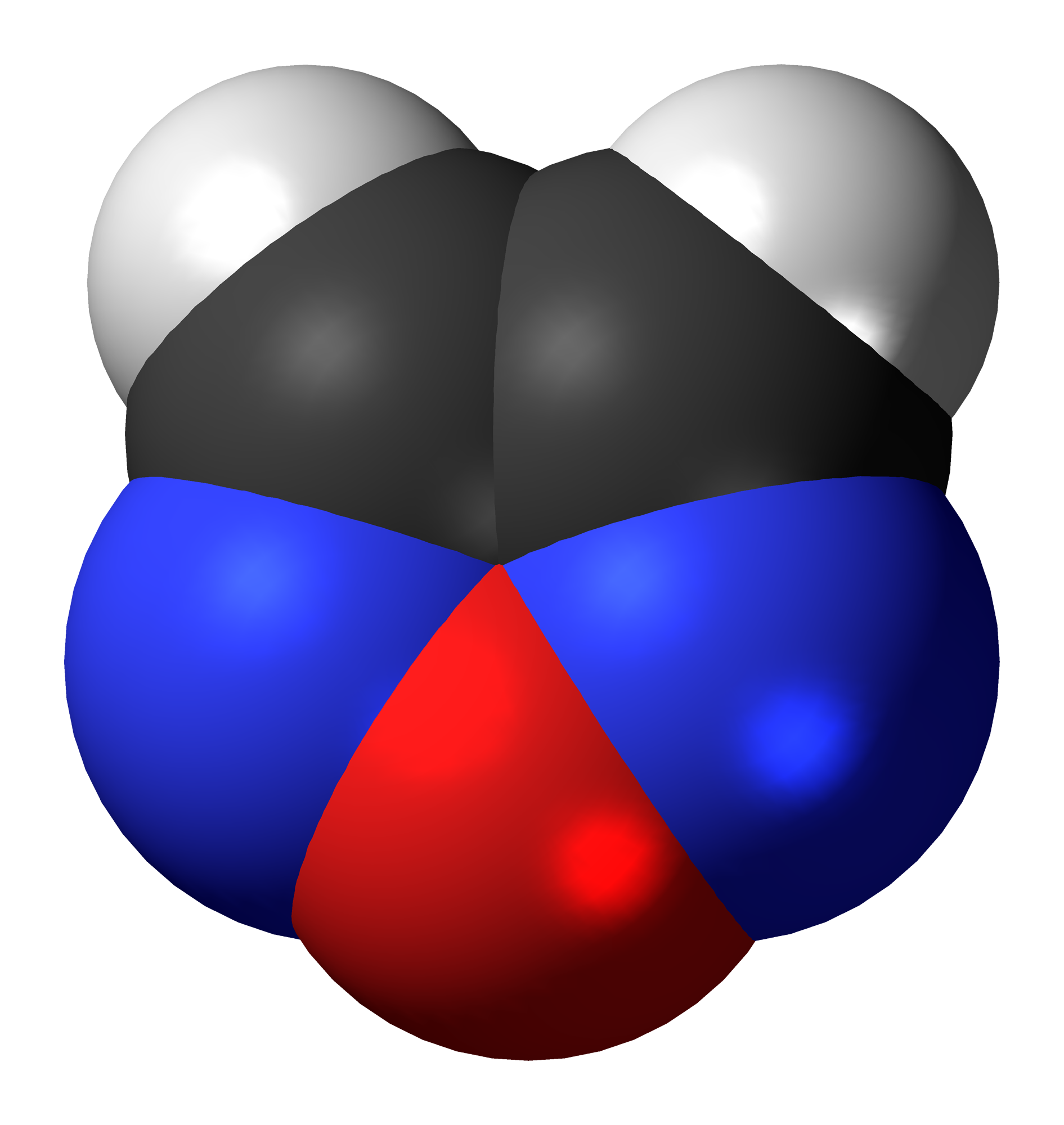

Names
- Preferred IUPAC name 1,2,5-Oxadiazole

Identifiers
CAS Number	288-37-9
3D model (JSmol)	Interactive image
ChemSpider	60840
PubChem CID	67517
UNII	63LL54U9WN
CompTox Dashboard (EPA)	DTXSID50182981
- InChI: InChI=1S/C2H2N2O/c1-2-4-5-3-1/h1-2H Key: JKFAIQOWCVVSKC-UHFFFAOYSA-N; InChI=1/C2H2N2O/c1-2-4-5-3-1/h1-2H Key: JKFAIQOWCVVSKC-UHFFFAOYAZ
- SMILES: n1oncc1

Properties
Chemical formula	C_{2}H_{2}N_{2}O
Molar mass	70.05008 g/mol
Appearance	clear oil
Density	1.168 g/cm^{3}
Melting point	−28 °C (−18 °F; 245 K)
Boiling point	98 °C (208 °F; 371 K)
- Except where otherwise noted, data are given for materials in their standard state (at 25 °C [77 °F], 100 kPa). verify (what is ?) Infobox references

Furazan, or 1,2,5-oxadiazole, is a heterocyclic aromatic organic compound consisting of a five-atom ring containing 1 oxygen and 2 nitrogen atoms. The furazan ring system is also found in the steroid furazabol. Furazan and its derivatives are obtained from the oxime derivatives of 1,2-diketones.

== Synthesis ==
In theory the simplest means of producing furazan is the cyclic-dehydration of glyoxime (the di-oxime of glyoxal), but the instability of furazan to high temperature or extremes of pH requires that this process be performed carefully. The formation of furazan from glyoxime is also exothermic and takes place with the copious evolution of noxious gases. The reaction may be achieved by heating glyoxime to 150 °C in the presence of succinic anhydride. Furazan will evaporate at that temperature, which continuously removes the product from the reaction mixture.

== Derivatives ==
=== 3,4-Dimethylfurazan ===
3,4-Dimethylfurazan (b.p. 154–159 °C) is prepared by an analogous process by dehydrating dimethylglyoxime. A variety of related derivatives are known, including diphenyl- and methylethylfurazan.

=== Carboxylic acid derivatives ===
Potassium permanganate oxidizes 3,4-dimethylfurazan first to methylfurazancarboxylic acid and then to furazandicarboxylic acid. By warming oxyfurazan acetic acid with excess of potassium permanganate, oxyfurazancarboxylic acid is obtained. It crystallizes as prisms (m.p. 175 °C). Furazancarboxylic acid (m.p. 107 °C) is prepared by oxidation of furazanpropionic acid with potassium permanganate. It dissolves in base to give nitrosocyanacetate.

=== Diaminofurazan ===
The energetic precursor, diaminofurazan, can be prepared by heating diaminoglyoxime with potassium hydroxide followed by cooling to give white crystals. Like many other furazans, diaminofurazan forms stable complexes with copper(II) salts.

=== Furoxan ===
Furoxan may be formed by dimerization of nitrile oxides
