= Montréalone =

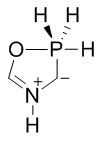
- Montréalone parent compound

Identifiers
CAS Number	1228992-40-2
3D model (JSmol)	Interactive image
PubChem CID	154735194
CompTox Dashboard (EPA)	DTXSID701018796
- InChI: InChI=1S/C2H5NOP/c1-3-2-5-4-1/h1-3H,5H2/q+1 Key: CEHNCPLHGNXBLW-UHFFFAOYSA-N
- SMILES: [CH-]1[NH+]=CO[PH2+]1
- Except where otherwise noted, data are given for materials in their standard state (at 25 °C [77 °F], 100 kPa). Infobox references

Montréalone (synonyms: montrealone, phospha-münchnone) is a mesoionic heterocyclic chemical compound. It is named for the city of Montréal, Canada, which is the location of McGill University, where it was first discovered.

== Structure ==
The montréalone parent compound has been studied theoretically, and is unlikely to exist as a stable species. Analogs bearing multiple substituents display stability suitable for synthesis, isolation, and characterization. Substituted montréalones with a balance of stability and reactivity have been used as reaction intermediates in the synthesis of other heterocycles.

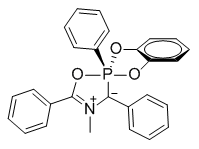
A substituted montréalone

Theoretical and experimental analysis of stable montréalones reveals overlapping azomethine ylide and Wittig-type moieties within the unsaturated 5-membered organophosphorus ring system. Depending on the phosphorus substituents, ring-chain valence tautomerism allows montréalones to display variable degrees of equilibrium and structural blending with N-acyl amino phosphonium ylide forms. The cyclic 1,3-dipolar form is detectably or exclusively formed with phosphite and phosphonite-based analogs. Triphenylphosphine-based variants lack sufficient tendency for intramolecular cyclization, and exist as acyclic phosphonium ylides.

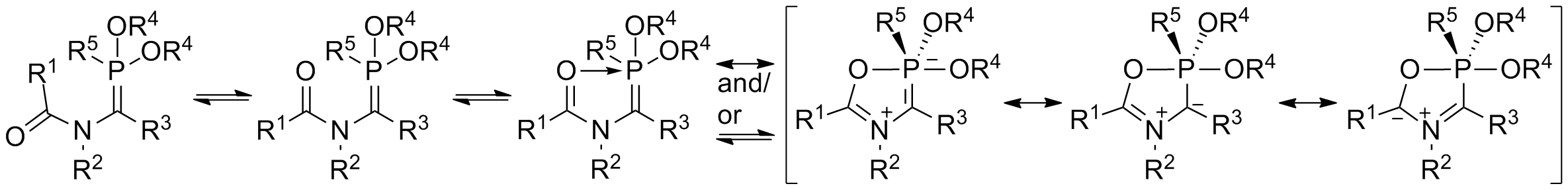

== Synthesis ==
Montréalones are related to Wittig reagents and can be generated in a similar fashion. Reaction of organophosphorus(III) compounds with N-acyliminium ions affords phosphonium salt intermediates which are deprotonated using non-nucleophilic bases (e.g. DBU, LiHMDS). N-Acyliminium ions are generated in situ from acid chlorides and imines such that the '1,3-dipole' itself is generated in a multi-component reaction. The most efficient phosphorus(III) precursor for dipole synthesis is 2-phenylbenzo[d][1,3,2]dioxaphosphole [PhP(catechyl)] owing to the balance of nucleophilicity and electrophilicity that it affords.

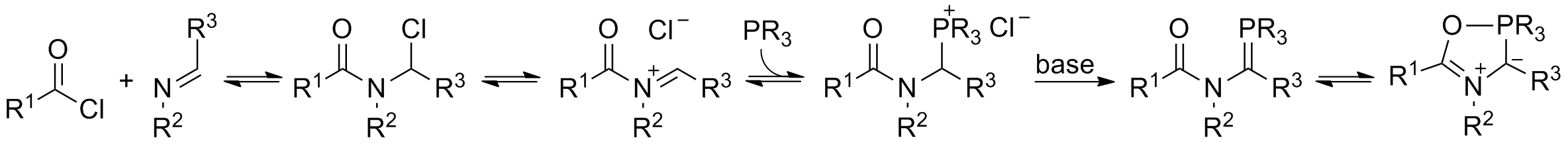

== Reactions ==
Montréalones participate in 1,3-dipolar cycloaddition reactions with dipolarophiles such as imines, alkenes, and alkynes to respectively afford imidazoles, 2-pyrrolines, and pyrroles. The latter heterocyclic products were obtained by multi-component reactions involving in situ-generation of montréalones from imines, acid chlorides, and phosphonites prior to one-pot reactions with the dipolarophile. Moreover, conjugated poly(1,3-dipole) variants of montréalones have been generated and used in the synthesis of polyheterocycles related to polypyrroles.

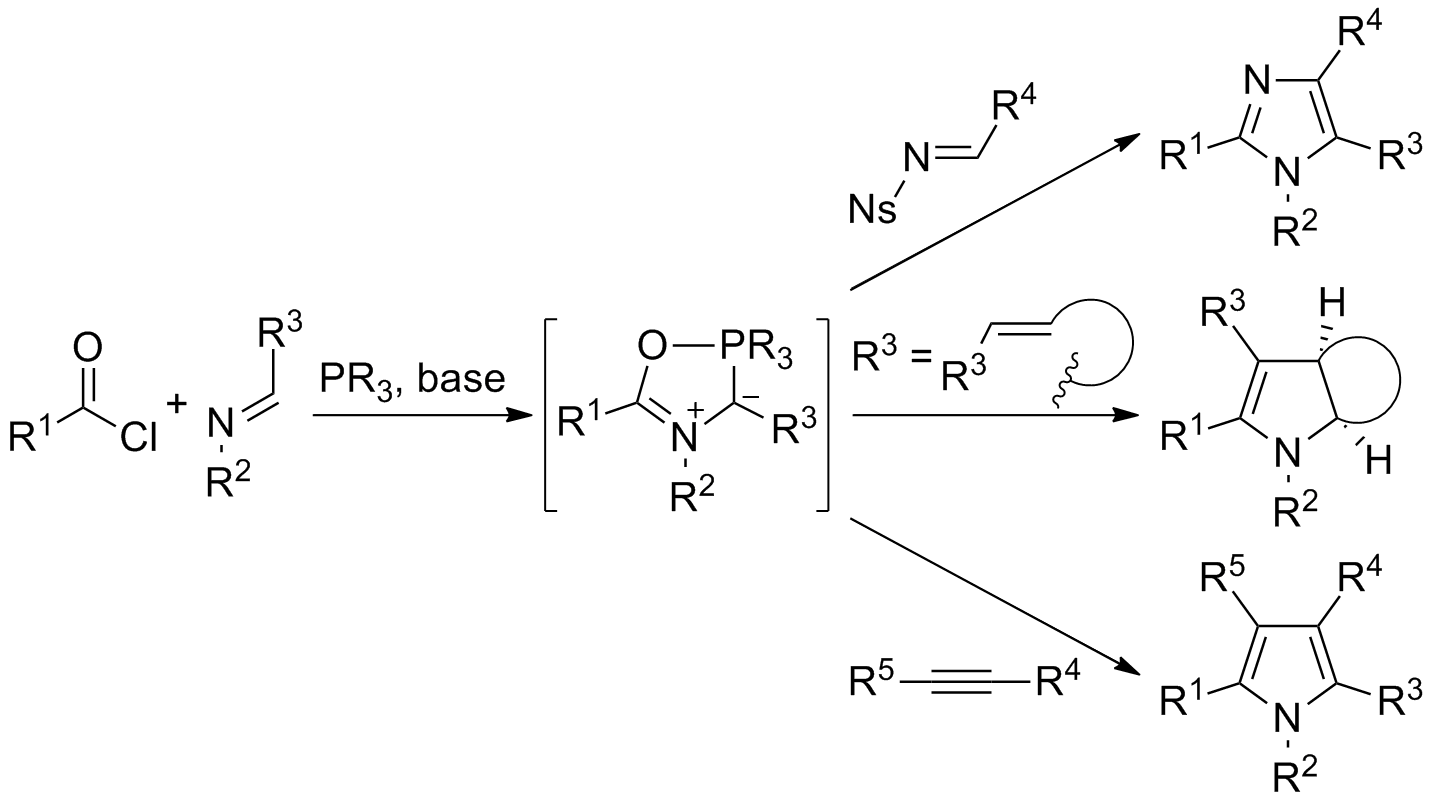

Cycloaddition reactions of asymmetric 1,3-dipoles and dipolarophiles can lead to isomeric product mixtures, particularly with münchnones and alkynes in the synthesis of pyrroles. In contrast to related Diels-Alder reactions, rationalization of regioisomeric bias using conventional frontier molecular orbital (FMO) theory fails. The complementary use of montéalones and münchnones allows product mixtures to be avoided and highlights the need to consider transition-state geometrical changes (distortion) in the rationalization process.

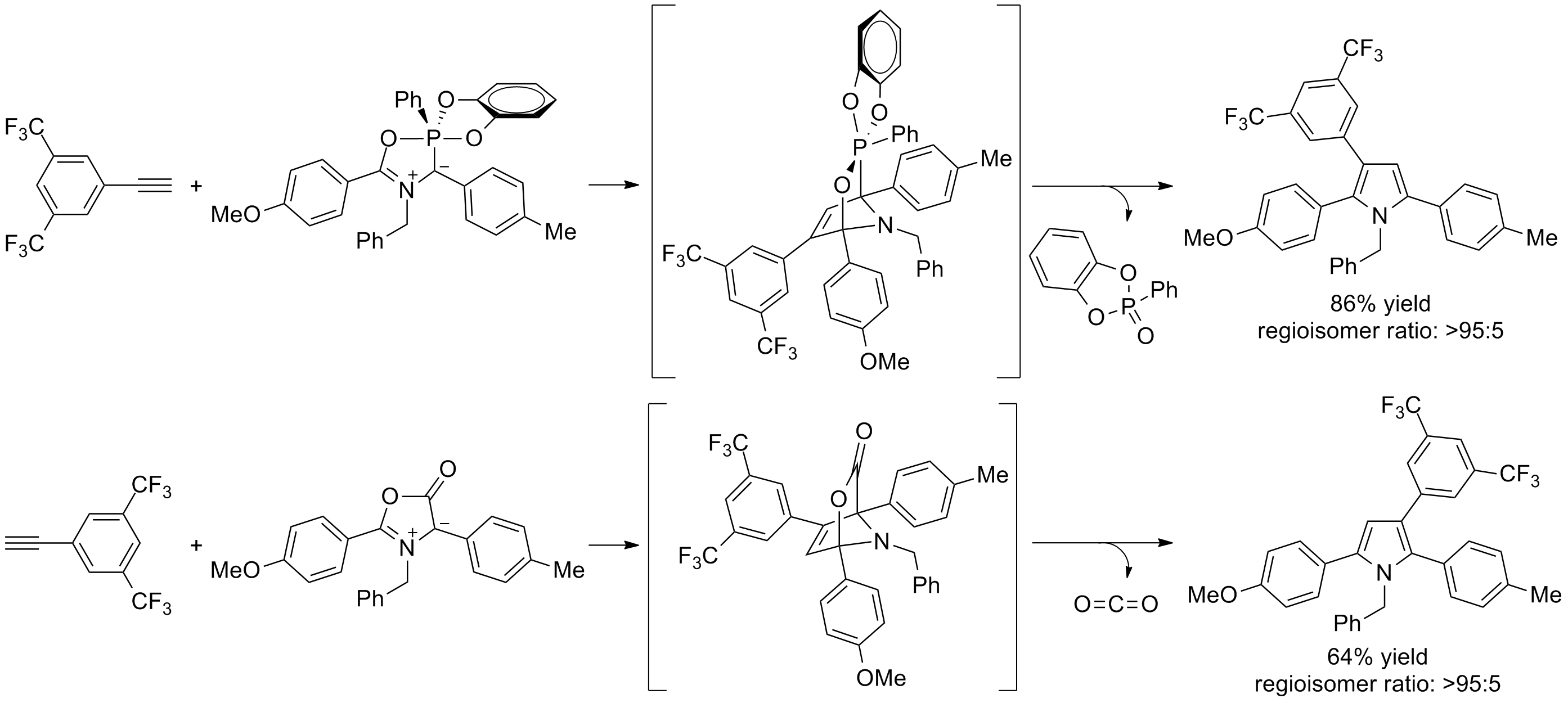

== See also ==
- Münchnone
- Sydnone
- Sydnone imine
- Chemical compounds with unusual names
