= C18H18N4O2 =

The molecular formula C_{18}H_{18}N_{4}O_{2} (molar mass: 322.368 g/mol) may refer to:

- Armesocarb
- Mesocarb
