= Heteropentalene =

Class of chemical compounds

Pyrrolo(3,2-b)pyrrole, a heteropentalene with two nitrogen atoms

Heteropentalenes are class of heterocyclic compound. Heteropentalenes are analogs of pentalene that have one, two, or more heteroatoms in the rings. It consists of two pentagonal rings. Heteropentalenes with 10 pi electrons show aromaticity. Some of heteropentalenes are mesomeric betaines. However those heteropentalenes are not mesoionic

== See also ==
- Benzimidazole
- Diazapentalene
- Indole
- Mesomeric betaine
- Trithiapentalene
