= Sin-1 =

Sin-1, SIN-1, sin-1, or sin^{−1} may refer to:

- SIN-1, Linsidomine (3-morpholinosydnonimine), a drug acting as a vasodilator
- sin x−1 = sin(x)−1 = −(1−sin(x)) = −cvs(x) or negative coversine of x, the additive inverse (or negation) of an old trigonometric function
- sin^{−1}y = sin^{−1}(y), sometimes interpreted as arcsin(y) or arcsine of y, the compositional inverse of the trigonometric function sine (see below for ambiguity)
- sin^{−1}x = sin^{−1}(x), sometimes interpreted as (sin(x))^{−1} = 1/sin(x) = csc(x) or cosecant of x, the multiplicative inverse (or reciprocal) of the trigonometric function sine (see above for ambiguity)
- sin x^{−1}, sometimes interpreted as sin(x^{−1}) = sin(1/x), the sine of the multiplicative inverse (or reciprocal) of x (see below for ambiguity)
- sin x^{−1}, sometimes interpreted as (sin(x))^{−1} = 1/sin(x) = csc(x) or cosecant of x, the multiplicative inverse (or reciprocal) of the trigonometric function sine (see above for ambiguity)

== See also ==
- Inverse function
- csc^{−1} (disambiguation)
- cos^{−1} (disambiguation)
