= Amfetaminil =

Amphetamine-derived stimulant drug

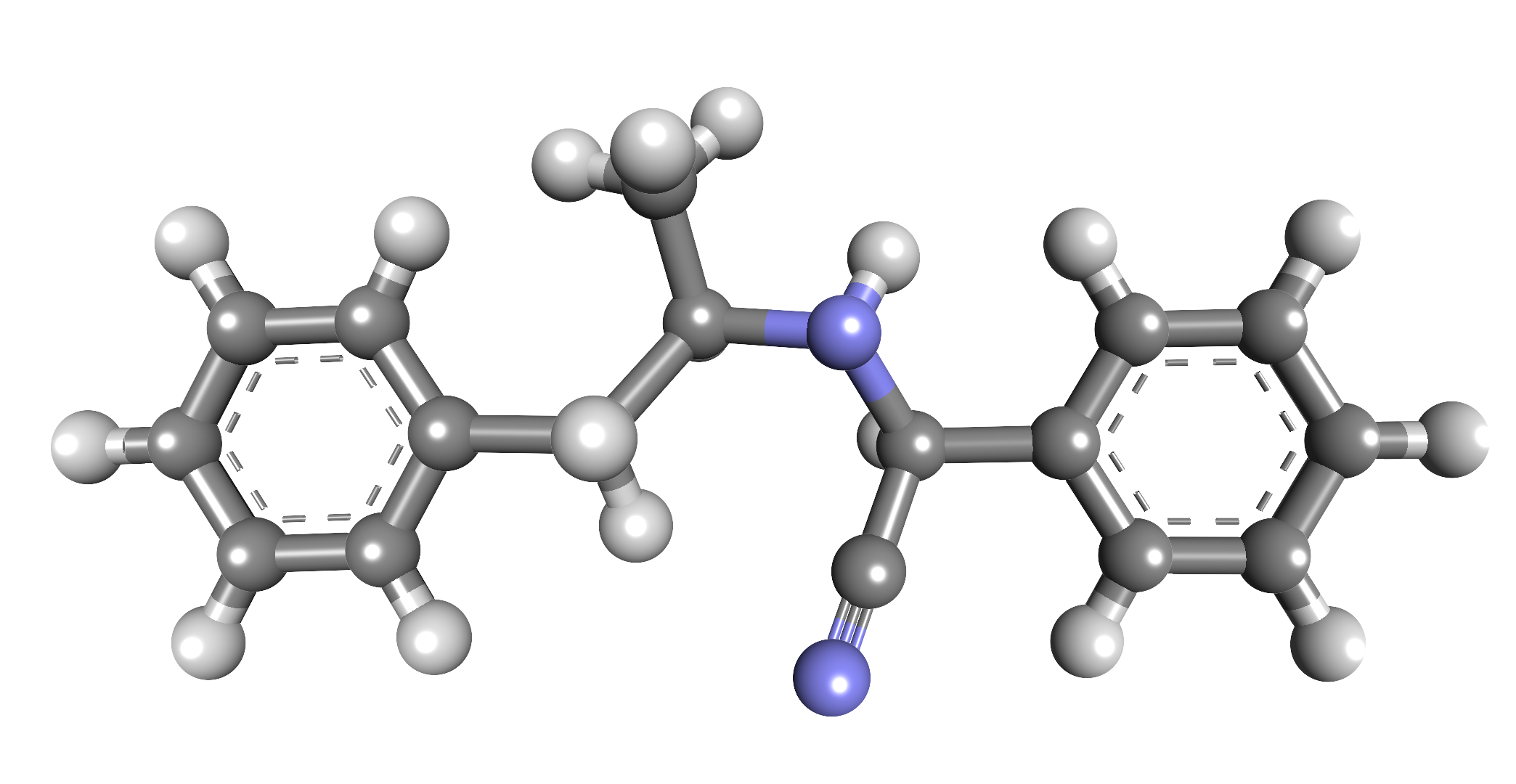

Clinical data
- Trade names: Aponeuron
- Other names: Amphetaminil; AN-1; N-Cyanobenzylamphetamine; N-(α′-Cyanobenzyl)amphetamine
- Routes of administration: Oral
- Drug class: Stimulant; Appetite suppressant; Norepinephrine–dopamine releasing agent
- ATC code: none

Legal status
- Legal status: DE: Anlage II (Authorized trade only, not prescriptible); US: Schedule IV

Identifiers
- IUPAC name: 2-Phenyl-2-(1-phenylpropan-2-ylamino)acetonitrile
- CAS Number: 17590-01-1
- PubChem CID: 28615
- ChemSpider: 26613
- UNII: 0XU0V77JVE
- KEGG: D07446
- ChEMBL: ChEMBL2104064
- CompTox Dashboard (EPA): DTXSID80864783
- ECHA InfoCard: 100.037.767

Chemical and physical data
- Formula: C_{17}H_{18}N_{2}
- Molar mass: 250.345 g·mol^{−1}
- 3D model (JSmol): Interactive image
- SMILES: N#CC(NC(C)Cc1ccccc1)c2ccccc2
- InChI: InChI=1S/C17H18N2/c1-14(12-15-8-4-2-5-9-15)19-17(13-18)16-10-6-3-7-11-16/h2-11,14,17,19H,12H2,1H3; Key:NFHVTCJKAHYEQN-UHFFFAOYSA-N

Amfetaminil (also known as amphetaminil, N-cyanobenzylamphetamine, and AN-1; brand name Aponeuron) is a stimulant drug derived from amphetamine, which was developed in the 1970s and used for the treatment of obesity, ADHD, and narcolepsy. It has largely been withdrawn from clinical use following problems with abuse. The drug is a prodrug to amphetamine.

== Chemistry ==
=== Stereochemistry ===
Amfetaminil is a molecule with two stereogenic centers. Thus, four different stereoisomers exist:

- (R)-2-[(R)-1-Phenylpropan-2-ylamino]-2-phenylacetonitrile (CAS number 478392-08-4)
- (S)-2-[(S)-1-Phenylpropan-2-ylamino]-2-phenylacetonitrile (CAS number 478392-12-0)
- (R)-2-[(S)-1-Phenylpropan-2-ylamino]-2-phenylacetonitrile (CAS number 478392-10-8)
- (S)-2-[(R)-1-Phenylpropan-2-ylamino]-2-phenylacetonitrile (CAS number 478392-14-2)

=== Synthesis ===
Synthesis:

Schiff base formation between amphetamine (1) and benzaldehyde (2) gives benzalamphetamine [2980-02-1] (3). Nucleophilic attack of cyanide anion on the imine (c.f. Strecker reaction) gives amfetaminil (4). Finally, reaction with nitrous acid gives (5). The rearrangement to a Sydnone then occurs to give CID:88166659 (6). Feprosidnine is sans the phenyl group.

== See also ==
- Substituted amphetamine
- 2C-B-AN
