= Diazapentalene =

Aromatic heterocyclic compounds with 6 carbon

Diazapentalene isomers: A) pyrrolo(3,4-c)pyrrole B) pyrrolo(3,4-b)pyrrole C) pyrrolo(2,3-b)pyrrole D) pyrrolo(3,2-b)pyrrole E) cyclopentapyrazole F) cyclopentaimidazole

In organic chemistry, a diazapentalene is any of the heterocyclic compounds having molecular formula C_{6}H_{6}N_{2} whose structure is two fused two pentagonal rings of six carbon atoms and two nitrogen atoms. That is, it is a heteropentalene, with two nitrogens substituted in for carbons. There are several different constitutional isomers. Each diazapentalene has 10 pi electrons and shows aromaticity. The isomers with one nitrogen in each ring are known as pyrrolopyrroles.

Some of the diazapentalenes are mesomeric betaines, however these diazapentalenes are not mesoionic.

== See also ==
- Pentalene
- Diketopyrrolopyrrole dye
- Thienothiophene
