= Sydnone =

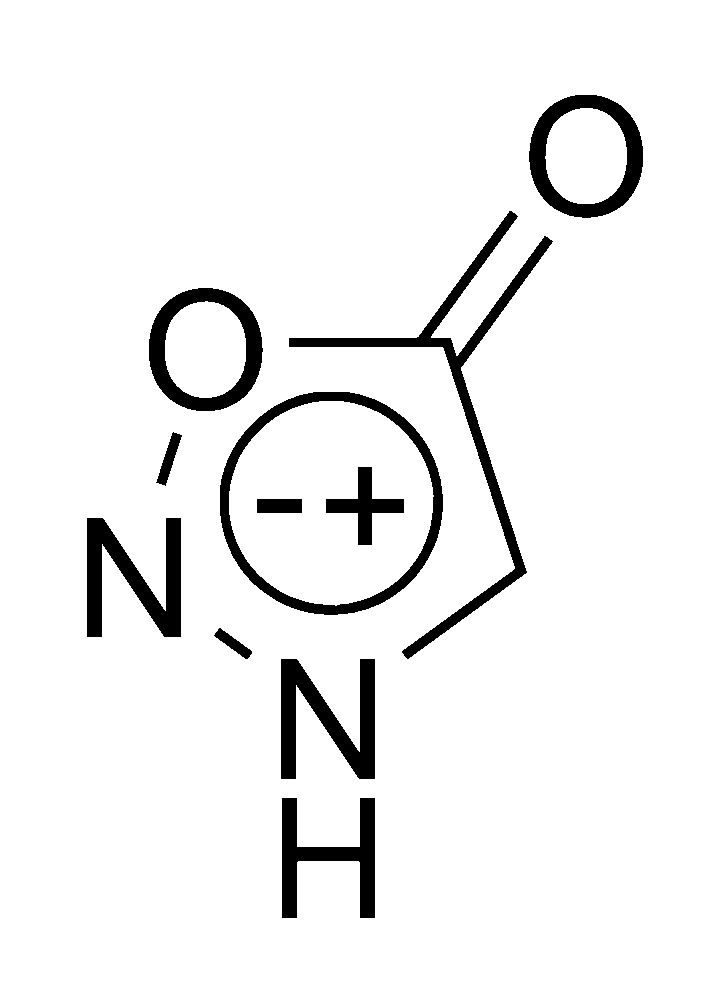

Names
- IUPAC name 2H-Oxadiazol-5-one
- Other names 1,2,3-Oxadiazol-5(2H)-one

Identifiers
CAS Number	534-24-7
3D model (JSmol)	Interactive image
ChemSpider	65792731
PubChem CID	12443168
- InChI: InChI=1S/C2H2N2O2/c5-2-1-3-4-6-2/h1,4H Key: BIGWXAGEQONZGD-UHFFFAOYSA-N
- SMILES: C1=NNOC1=O

Properties
Chemical formula	C_{2}H_{2}N_{2}O_{2}
Molar mass	86.050 g·mol^{−1}
- Except where otherwise noted, data are given for materials in their standard state (at 25 °C [77 °F], 100 kPa). Infobox references

Sydnones are mesoionic heterocyclic chemical compounds possessing a C5-oxygenated 1,2,3-oxadiazole core, named after the city of Sydney, Australia. Like other mesoionic compounds they are dipolar, possessing both positive and negative charges which are delocalized across the ring.

== Discovery ==
N-Phenylsydnone was first prepared in 1935 by John Campbell Earl and Alan W. Mackney by cyclodehydration of N-nitroso-N-phenylglycine with acetic anhydride. Later work showed that this could be applied fairly generally to the nitrosamines of N-substituted amino acids.

The parent compound sydnone is not synthetically accessible and may not exist.

== Chemical structure ==
Sydnones have the following resonance structures. The exocyclic oxygen atom (O6) has a significant negative charge.

Recent computational studies have indicated that sydnones and other similar mesoionic compounds are nonaromatic, "though well-stabilized in two separate regions by electron and charge delocalization."

== Examples ==
- Cefanone (cephanone)
- Ipramidil
- 3-Thiomorpholino-sydnonimine
- The reaction between methyl 3-benzyl-sydnone-4-acetate and diphenylacetylene gives an analog of bufezolac.
- Coumarinyl sydnone derivatives.

== Related compounds ==
A sydnone imine in which the keto group of sydnone (=O) has been replaced with an imino (=NH) group can be found as a substructure in the stimulant drugs feprosidnine and mesocarb.

== See also ==
- Chemical compounds with unusual names
- Montréalone
- Münchnone
- Sydnone imine
