= Sydnone imine =

Class of chemical compounds

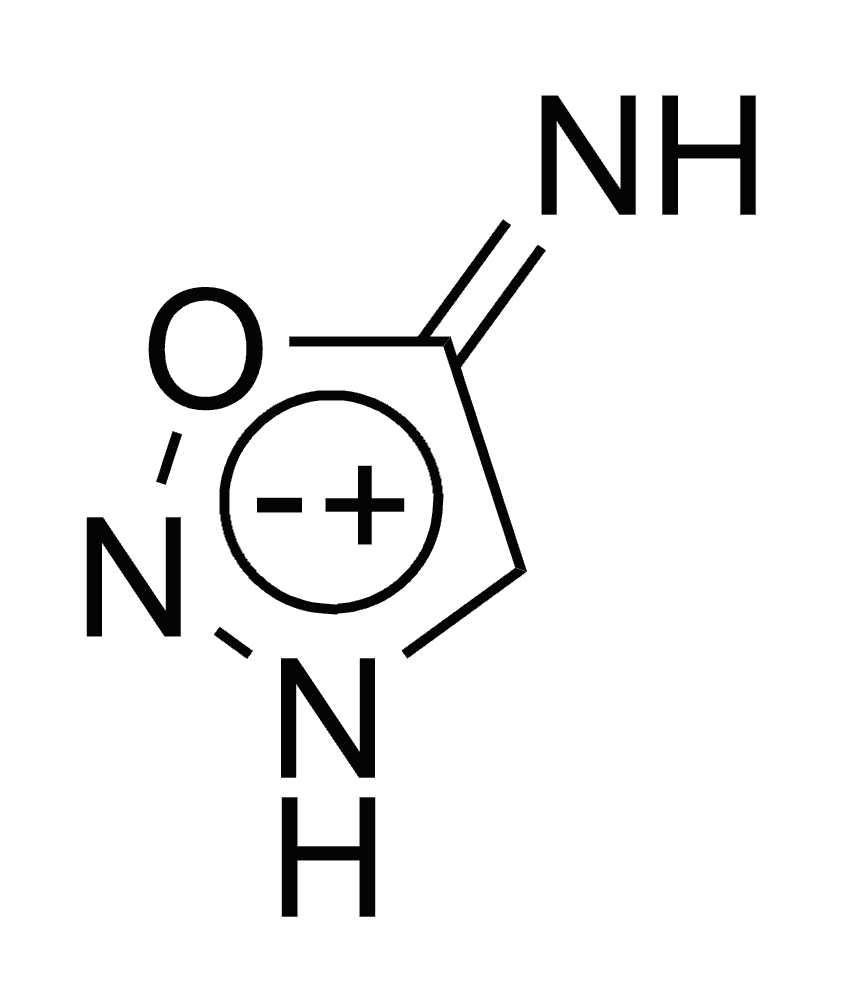
Chemical structure of sydnone imine

Sydnone imine is a mesoionic heterocyclic aromatic chemical compound. Sydnone imine is the imine of sydnone where the keto functional group of sydnone (=O) has been replaced with an imine (=NH) group.

== Pharmaceutical drugs ==
A variety of pharmaceutical drugs include sydnone imines in their chemical structure including feprosidnine, linsidomine, mesocarb, and molsidomine, among others.

== Chemical structure ==
In sydnone imines, both the negative and the positive charges are delocalized within the ring and the imine group.

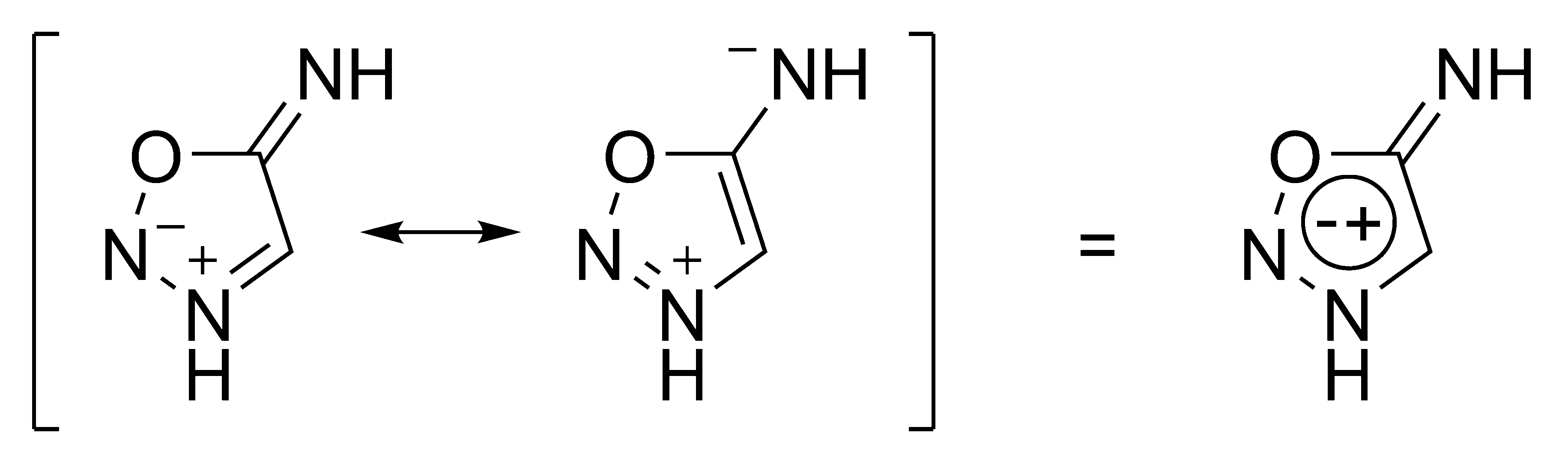

== See also ==
- Montréalone
- Münchnone
- Sydnone
