= Feprosidnine =

Chemical compound

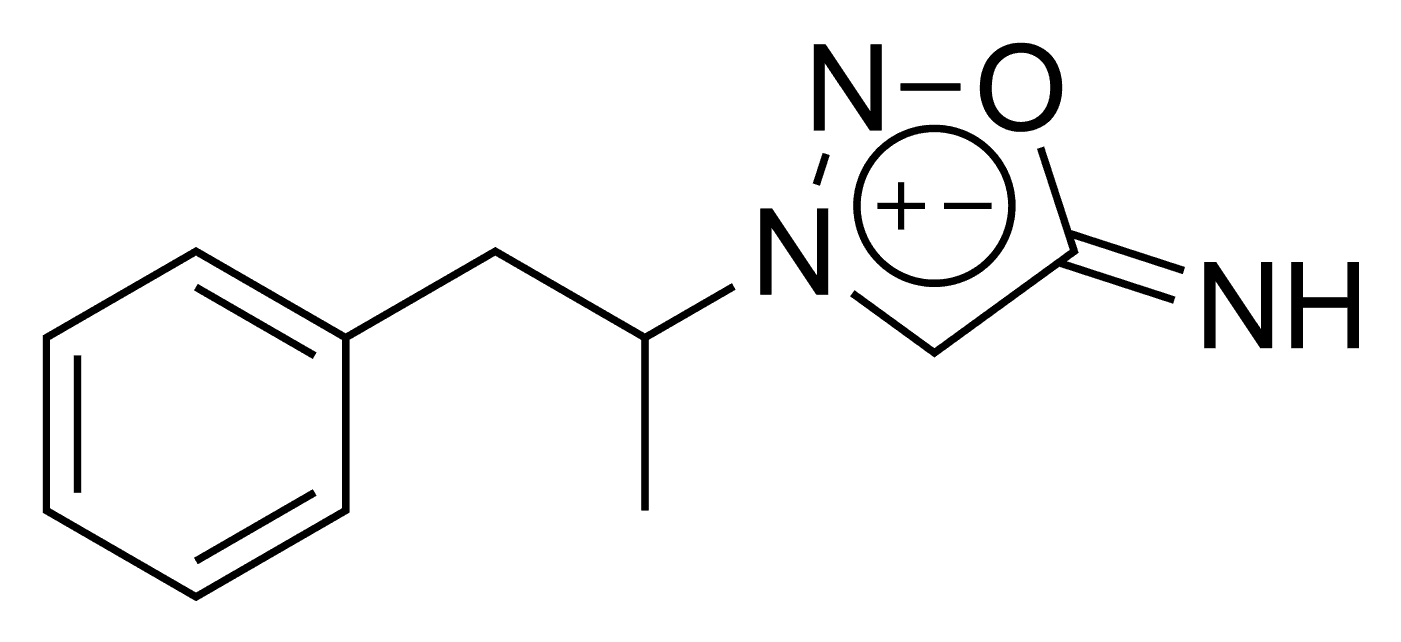

Clinical data
- ATC code: none

Identifiers
- IUPAC name: 5-Imino-3-(1-phenylpropan-2-yl)-5H-1,2,3-oxadiazol-3-ium-2-ide
- CAS Number: 22293-47-6
- PubChem CID: 72088
- ChemSpider: 65073
- UNII: 1G4W8NR1PT
- ChEMBL: ChEMBL2104320
- CompTox Dashboard (EPA): DTXSID801027235

Chemical and physical data
- Formula: C_{11}H_{13}N_{3}O
- Molar mass: 203.245 g·mol^{−1}
- 3D model (JSmol): Interactive image
- SMILES: n1oc([NH-])c[n+]1C(Cc2ccccc2)C
- InChI: InChI=1S/C11H13N3O/c1-9(14-8-11(12)15-13-14)7-10-5-3-2-4-6-10/h2-6,8-9,12H,7H2,1H3; Key:HFLCEELTJROKMJ-UHFFFAOYSA-N

Feprosidnine, sold under the brand name Sydnophen, is a stimulant drug which was developed in the USSR in the 1970s. It is structurally related to another Russian drug mesocarb but unlike mesocarb, was withdrawn earlier from production. In comparison with mesocarb it has own antidepressant activity, which makes it useful in treating depressions. Indications of feprosidnine included apathic, asthenic depressions, fatigue, apathic syndrome, narcolepsy and other similar conditions. Therapeutic range of doses: 10-50mg a day. Sydnophen has multiple mechanisms of action, the relative importance of which has not been clearly established. Effects on the body include reversible monoamine oxidase inhibition, cholinergic, adrenergic, opioid and nitric oxide donating actions, all of which may contribute to its pharmacological effects to some extent.

== Chemistry ==
Feprosidnine is a mesoionic sydnone imine.

A similar agent is described in the Amfetaminil article.

== Synthesis ==
Patent:

Base catalyzed reaction between acetone cyanohydrin and 40% formaldehyde solution gives glycolonitrile (1) & some acetone by-product. The amphetamine [300-62-9] (2) is then added and this is allowed to react overnight to give N-(1-phenyl-2-propylamine)-acetonitrile (3). Nitrosylation of the amino group by in situ creation of nitrous acid from hydrochloric acid and sodium nitrite results in a 51.5% yield of feprosidnine based on the initial weight of the amine (4).

== See also ==
- List of Russian drugs
