= Phenyl isocyanate =

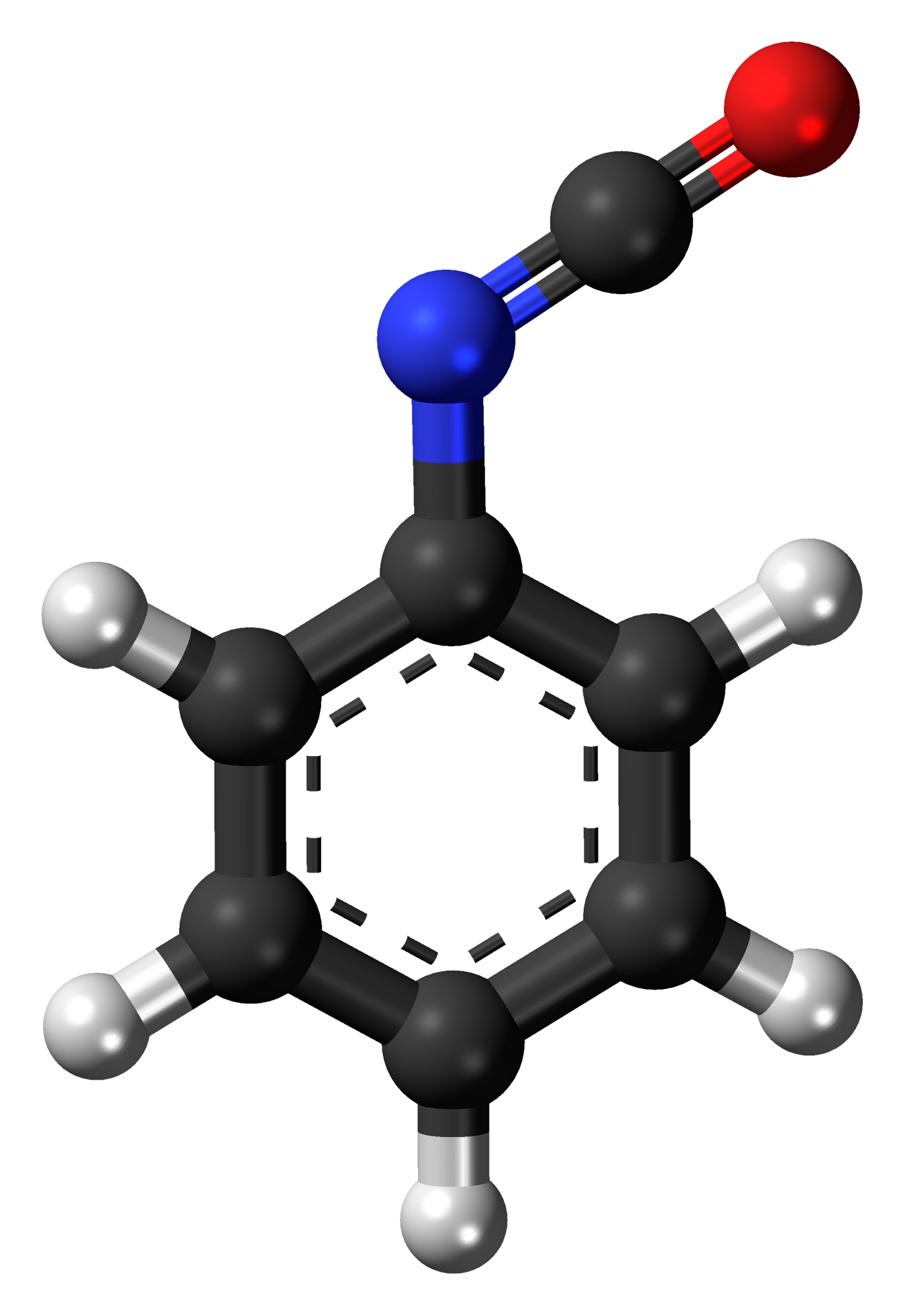

Names
- Preferred IUPAC name Isocyanatobenzene

Identifiers
CAS Number	103-71-9
3D model (JSmol)	Interactive image
ChEBI	CHEBI:53806
ChemSpider	7389
ECHA InfoCard	100.002.852
EC Number	203-137-6
PubChem CID	7672
UNII	196GO6BSOH
UN number	2487
CompTox Dashboard (EPA)	DTXSID5051521
- InChI: InChI=1S/C7H5NO/c9-6-8-7-4-2-1-3-5-7/h1-5H Key: DGTNSSLYPYDJGL-UHFFFAOYSA-N
- SMILES: O=C=N/c1ccccc1

Properties
Chemical formula	C_{7}H_{5}NO
Molar mass	119.123 g·mol^{−1}
Appearance	Colourless liquid
Density	1.09
Melting point	−30 °C (−22 °F; 243 K)
Boiling point	165 °C (329 °F; 438 K)
Solubility in water	Reacts with water
Magnetic susceptibility (χ)	−72.7·10^{−6} cm^{3}/mol

Hazards
- GHS labelling
Pictograms	(GHS02: Flammable) (GHS05: Corrosive) (GHS06: Toxic) (GHS07: Exclamation mark) (GHS08: Health hazard) (GHS09: Environmental hazard)
Signal word	Danger
Hazard statements	H226, H302, H314, H317, H330, H334, H335, H410, H411
Precautionary statements	P210, P233, P240, P241, P242, P243, P260, P264, P264+P265, P270, P271, P272, P273, P280, P284, P301+P317, P301+P330+P331, P302+P352, P302+P361+P354, P303+P361+P353, P304+P340, P305+P354+P338, P316, P317, P319, P320, P321, P330, P333+P317, P342+P316, P362+P364, P363, P370+P378, P391, P403, P403+P233, P403+P235, P405, P501
- Except where otherwise noted, data are given for materials in their standard state (at 25 °C [77 °F], 100 kPa). verify (what is ?) Infobox references

Phenyl isocyanate is an organic compound typically abbreviated PhNCO. The molecule consists of a phenyl ring attached to the isocyanate functional group. It is a colourless liquid that reacts with water. Phenyl isocyanate has a strong odor and tearing vapours, therefore it has to be handled with care.

Characteristic of other isocyanates, it reacts with amines to give ureas. Similarly, reacts with alcohols to form carbamates.

It is used in addition with triethylamine to activate nitro groups to undergo (C,O) 1,3-dipolar cycloaddition (as opposed to O,O). The nitro group (RCH_{2}NO_{2}) is converted to oxime-like dimers in the reaction:

4 PhNCO + 2 RCH_{2}NO_{2} → 2(PhNH)_{2}CO + 2 CO_{2} + (RCNO)_{2}

== Structure ==
PhNCO is a planar molecule, according to X-ray crystallography. The N=C=O linkage is nearly linear. The C=N and C=O distances are respectively 1.195 and 1.173 Å.

== Applications ==
The known uses of phenyl isocyanate include in the synthesis of: fenuron, mesocarb, pencycuron, merbarone, siduron, carbetamide, frentizole, diperodon.
