= John Campbell Earl =

John Campbell Earl (18 May 1890 – 25 December 1978) was an Australian chemist and academic, best known for discovering the cyclic compounds known as sydnones and for leading major chemical defense research during World War II. He served as chair of organic chemistry at the University of Sydney from 1928 to 1947.

== Early life and education ==
Earl was born in North Adelaide to Robert Campbell Earl and Elizabeth Mortlock (née Lucas). After the early death of his parents, he was sent to England, where he was educated at Great Yarmouth Grammar School. He studied chemistry at the City and Guilds Technical College in London and joined the Imperial Institute in 1911. During World War I, Earl worked in explosives factories at Gretna, Scotland.

He returned to South Australia in 1913 and became an assistant government analyst. He later earned a Ph.D. from the University of St Andrews in 1920, followed by a Bachelor of Science (1921) and a Doctor of Science (1926) from the University of Adelaide. He was awarded a second D.Sc. by the University of St Andrews in 1949.

== Career ==
In 1922, Earl joined the University of Sydney as a lecturer and was appointed chair of organic chemistry in 1928.

During the 1930s, his research focused on aliphatic nitroso compounds, leading to the discovery of a new class of cyclic compounds, which he named sydnones after the University of Sydney. He published this work in the Journal of the Chemical Society in 1935 and received the H. G. Smith Medal from the Royal Australian Chemical Institute.

During World War II, Earl redirected his department toward government-supported defense research. His group carried out a range of urgent projects, including the pilot-scale preparation of the antiseptic proflavine, the large-scale production of British Anti-Lewisite as a chemical warfare antidote, the development of colored smokes suitable for jungle combat signaling, the industrial production of dimethylaniline for conversion into tetryl, and the creation of a dye-line process for rapid military map reproduction. For these contributions, he was elected a life member of the Society of Chemical Industry (London).

Although regarded as an effective supervisor, Earl's unconventional views on university administration led to ongoing friction with colleagues. He took early retirement in 1947 and moved to Thurlton, Norfolk, England, with his wife, Winifred Kate Vincent Jones.

In England, he worked as a consultant and served as an editor for British Chemical Abstracts. After his wife's death in 1967, he returned to Adelaide, where he was acting master of Kathleen Lumley College from 1969 to 1970. He continued to publish occasional papers until his death on Christmas Day, 1978.
