= Thienothiophene =

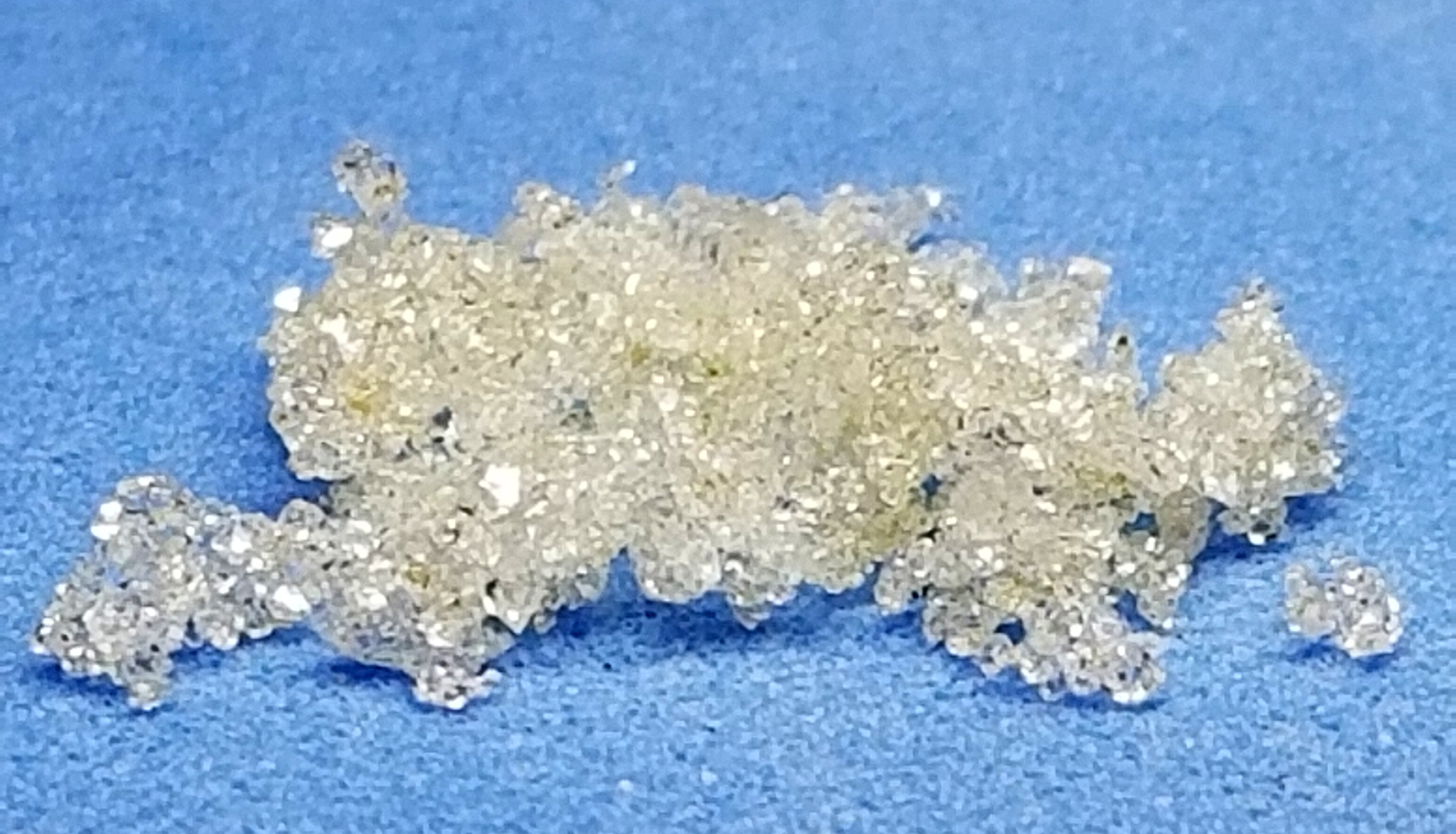
Thieno[3,2-b]thiophene

In organic chemistry, thienothiophene is any of several compounds consisting of two fused thiophene rings. They have the molecular formula C_{6}H_{4}S_{2}. Three constitutional isomers have been synthesized: thieno[3,2-b]thiophene, thieno[2,3-b]thiophene, and thieno[3,4-b]thiophene. The other isomer features S(IV) and is less stable. Thieno[2,3-b]thiophene was the first member of the series to be isolated. It was obtained in very low yield upon heating citric acid, a source of a six-carbon linear chain, with P_{4}S_{10}. More efficient syntheses of this and the other two stable thienothiophenes involve cyclization reactions of substituted thiophenes.

Three thienothiophenes, being aromatic and bicyclic, are often compared to naphthalene. They and their benzo derivatives are the topic of research in molecular electronics. They nor their derivatives are found naturally.

Isomers of thienothiophene

Thieno[3,2-b]thiophene
CAS RN 251-41-2
m.p. 56.0-56.5 °C
white solid.

Thieno[2,3-b]thiophene
CAS RN 250-84-0
b.p. 102 °C at 16 mmHg
colorless oil.

Thieno[3,4-b]thiophene
CAS RN 250-65-7
m.p. 7.0-7.5 °C
colorless oil.

2λ^{4}δ^{2}-Thieno[3,4-c]thiophene
CAS RN 24976-21-4
not isolated.

== See also ==
- Bithiophene - two unfused thiophene rings
- Sulflower - eight thiophene rings fused into a larger ring
- Trithiapentalene
- Diazapentalene
