= Mesomeric betaine =

Dipolar heterocyclic compound

Mesomeric betaines are dipolar heterocyclic compounds in which both the negative and the positive charges are delocalized.

Examples are mesoionic compounds and heteropentalenes (e.g. diazapentalenes). Heteropentalenes are not mesoionic.
