= Trithiapentalene =

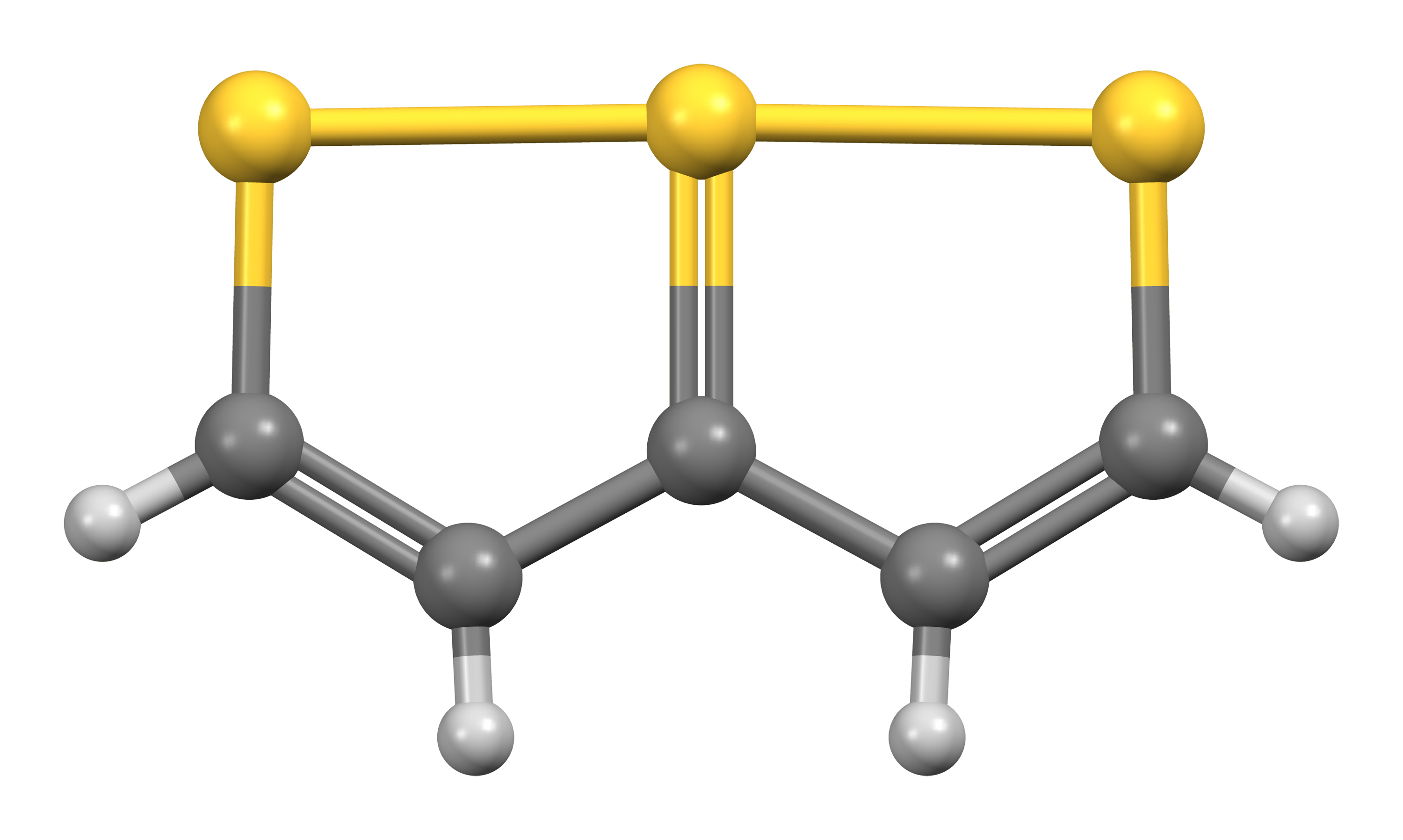

Names
- Preferred IUPAC name 7λ^{4}-[1,2]Dithiolo[1,5-b][1,2]dithiole
- Other names 1,6,6aλ^{4}-Trithiapentalene, 6a-Thiothiophthene, 6a-Thiathiophthene

Identifiers
CAS Number	252-09-5
3D model (JSmol)	Interactive image
ChemSpider	119841
PubChem CID	136064
UNII	YCW5D22WNB
CompTox Dashboard (EPA)	DTXSID80948052
- InChI: InChI=1S/C5H4S3/c1-3-6-8-5(1)2-4-7-8/h1-4H Key: JUEJPBZMWHMMPS-UHFFFAOYSA-N
- SMILES: C1=CSS2=C1C=CS2

Properties
Chemical formula	C_{5}H_{4}S_{3}
Molar mass	160.27 g·mol^{−1}
Appearance	Orange–red solid
- Except where otherwise noted, data are given for materials in their standard state (at 25 °C [77 °F], 100 kPa). Infobox references

Trithiapentalene is an organic bicyclic molecule containing two sulfur heterocycles. Its 10-π aromatic structure is similar to naphthalene. There has been a literature dispute about whether the connectivity among the three sulfur atoms is a case of rapid tautomerization between two valence tautomers or a 3-center 4-electron bond.

Resonance structures of trithiapentalene

The reactions have been little studied. It forms a dinickel complex upon reaction with bis(allyl)nickel.

== See also ==
- Dithiolium salt
- Thienothiophene
