= Cos-1 =

Cos-1, COS-1, cos-1, or cos^{−1} may refer to:

- Cos-1, one of two commonly used COS cell lines
- cos x−1 = cos(x)−1 = −(1−cos(x)) = −ver(x) or negative versine of x, the additive inverse (or negation) of an old trigonometric function
- cos^{−1}y = cos^{−1}(y), sometimes interpreted as arccos(y) or arccosine of y, the compositional inverse of the trigonometric function cosine (see below for ambiguity)
- cos^{−1}x = cos^{−1}(x), sometimes interpreted as (cos(x))^{−1} = 1/cos(x) = sec(x) or secant of x, the multiplicative inverse (or reciprocal) of the trigonometric function cosine (see above for ambiguity)
- cos x^{−1}, sometimes interpreted as cos(x^{−1}) = cos(1/x), the cosine of the multiplicative inverse (or reciprocal) of x (see below for ambiguity)
- cos x^{−1}, sometimes interpreted as (cos(x))^{−1} = 1/cos(x) = sec(x) or secant of x, the multiplicative inverse (or reciprocal) of the trigonometric function cosine (see above for ambiguity)

== See also ==
- Inverse function
- sec^{−1} (disambiguation)
- sin^{−1} (disambiguation)
