= Betaine =

Neutral chemical compounds

Cocamidopropyl betaine is an example of a betaine

A betaine (/ˈbiːtə.iːn, bɪˈteɪ-, -ɪn/) is any neutral chemical compound with a positively charged cationic functional group that bears no hydrogen atom, such as a quaternary ammonium or phosphonium cation (generally: onium ions), and with a negatively charged functional group, such as a carboxylate group that may not be adjacent to the cationic site. They are thus zwitterions, but cannot isomerize because there is no labile hydrogen atom attached to the nitrogen atom.

Historically, the term was reserved for trimethylglycine (TMG), which is involved in methylation reactions and detoxification of homocysteine.

== Pronunciation ==
The pronunciation of the compound reflects its origin and first isolation from sugar beets (Beta vulgaris subsp. vulgaris), and does not derive from the Greek letter beta (β). It is commonly pronounced beta-INE or BEE-tayn.

== Occurrence ==
The most common natural betaine is the original betaine, N‑trimethylglycine (glycine betaine).

The related choline deprotonates to give a betaine, but the resulting anion is typically acylated under biological conditions.

Phosphonium betaines are intermediates in the some Wittig reactions.

Cocamidopropyl betaine and various derivatives are surfactants, especially in shampoos.

=== Glycine betaine ===
The chemical structure of trimethylglycine

The original betaine, N,N,N-trimethylglycine, was named after its discovery in sugar beet (Beta vulgaris subsp. vulgaris) in the nineteenth century. It is a small N-trimethylated amino acid. This substance may be called glycine betaine to distinguish it from other betaines.

It serves as a methyl donor for various metabolic pathways.

== See also ==
- Mesoionic
- Mesomeric betaine
- Osmoprotectants
- Ylide
