= Csc-1 =

Csc-1, CSC-1, csc-1, or csc^{−1} may refer to:

- csc^{−1}y = csc^{−1}(y), sometimes interpreted as arccsc(y) or arccosecant of y, the compositional inverse of the trigonometric function cosecant (see below for ambiguity)
- csc^{−1}x = csc^{−1}(x), sometimes interpreted as (csc(x))^{−1} = 1/csc(x) = sin(x) or sine of x, the multiplicative inverse (or reciprocal) of the trigonometric function cosecant (see above for ambiguity)
- csc x^{−1}, sometimes interpreted as csc(x^{−1}) = csc(1/x), the cosecant of the multiplicative inverse (or reciprocal) of x (see below for ambiguity)
- csc x^{−1}, sometimes interpreted as (csc(x))^{−1} = 1/csc(x) = sin(x) or sine of x, the multiplicative inverse (or reciprocal) of the trigonometric function cosecant (see above for ambiguity)

== See also ==
- Inverse function
- sin^{−1} (disambiguation)
- sec^{−1} (disambiguation)
