= Sec-1 =

Sec-1, SEC-1, sec-1, or sec^{−1} may refer to:

- sec x − 1 = exsec x, the exsecant of x, an old trigonometric function
- sec^{−1}y = sec^{−1}(y), sometimes interpreted as arcsec(y) or arcsecant of y, the compositional inverse of the trigonometric function secant (see below for ambiguity)
- sec^{−1}x = sec^{−1}(x), sometimes interpreted as (sec(x))^{−1} = 1/sec(x) = cos(x) or cosine of x, the multiplicative inverse (or reciprocal) of the trigonometric function secant (see above for ambiguity)
- sec x^{−1}, sometimes interpreted as sec(x^{−1}) = sec(1/x), the secant of the multiplicative inverse (or reciprocal) of x (see below for ambiguity)
- secx^{−1}, sometimes interpreted as (sec(x))^{−1} = 1/sec(x) = cos(x) or cosine of x, the multiplicative inverse (or reciprocal) of the trigonometric function secant (see above for ambiguity)

== See also ==
- Second (time)
- Seconds of arc, a unit for angle measurement
- Inverse function
- cos^{−1} (disambiguation)
- csc^{−1} (disambiguation)
