= Münchnone =

Organic compound

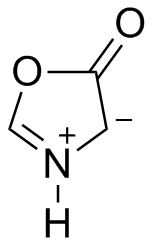
- Munchnone parent compound

Names
- IUPAC name 1,3-oxazol-5-ol

Identifiers
CAS Number	1044758-89-5
3D model (JSmol)	Interactive image
ChemSpider	11455991
PubChem CID	12313816
CompTox Dashboard (EPA)	DTXSID001018795
- InChI: InChI=1S/C3H3NO2/c5-3-1-4-2-6-3/h1-2,5H Key: IUNPZDITMZHUQF-UHFFFAOYSA-N
- SMILES: C1=C(OC=N1)O

Properties
Chemical formula	C_{3}H_{3}NO_{2}
Molar mass	85.062 g·mol^{−1}
- Except where otherwise noted, data are given for materials in their standard state (at 25 °C [77 °F], 100 kPa). Infobox references

Münchnone (synonyms: 1,3-oxazolium-5-oxide; 1,3-oxazolium-5-olate; anhydro-5-hydroxy-1,3-oxazolium hydroxide; 5-hydroxy-1,3-oxazolium hydroxide, inner salt; oxido-oxazolium) is a mesoionic heterocyclic aromatic chemical compound, with the molecular formula C_{3}H_{3}NO_{2}. The name refers to the city of Munich, Germany (German: München), where the compound and its derivatives were first discovered and studied.

== Synthesis and reactivity ==
The first preparation of a münchnone derivative was reported in 1959 by Lawson & Miles by cyclodehydration of 2-pyridone-N-acetic acid with acetic anhydride. The azomethine ylide reactivity of münchnones, and their reaction with alkynes in the synthesis of pyrroles, was first published by Huisgen et al. The Huisgen group followed up with a thorough investigation of the chemical properties, reactivity, and utility of münchnones towards the synthesis of many other products. As such, they are typically credited for the discovery of the münchnone class of molecules. While certain substituted münchnones are stable and easily isolated under ambient conditions, the majority are unstable, including the parent münchnone itself. Münchnones are typically used as 1,3-dipolar cycloaddition substrates in the synthesis of pyrroles by their in situ generation in the presence of alkynes.

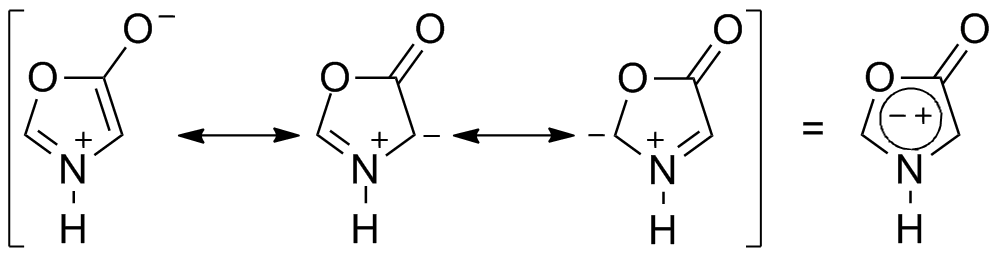

== See also ==
- Chemical compounds with unusual names
- Montréalone
- 5-Oxazolone (tautomer)
- Sydnone
- Sydnone imine
