= Tautomer =

Isomers of chemical compounds that interconvert

The tautomers of an amino acid: (1) neutral and (2) zwitterionic forms

In chemistry, tautomers (/ˈtɔːtəmər/) are a subset of structural isomers (constitutional isomers) of chemical compounds that readily interconvert. The chemical reaction interconverting the two is called tautomerization. This conversion commonly results from the relocation of a hydrogen atom within the compound. The phenomenon of tautomerization is called tautomerism, also called desmotropism. Tautomerism is for example relevant to the behavior of amino acids and nucleic acids, two of the fundamental building blocks of life.

Care should be taken not to confuse tautomers with depictions of "contributing structures" in chemical resonance. Tautomers are distinct chemical species that can be distinguished by their differing atomic connectivities, molecular geometries, and physicochemical and spectroscopic properties, whereas resonance forms are merely alternative Lewis structure (valence bond theory) depictions of a single chemical species, whose true structure is a quantum superposition, essentially the "average" of the idealized, hypothetical geometries implied by these resonance forms.

The term tautomer is derived from Ancient Greek ταὐτό (tautó) 'the same' and μέρος (méros) 'part'.

== Examples ==
Some examples of tautomers

Keto-enol tautomerization typically strongly favors the keto tautomer, but an important exception is the case of 1,3-diketones such as acetylacetone.

Tautomerization is pervasive in organic chemistry. It is typically associated with polar molecules and ions containing functional groups that are at least weakly acidic. Most common tautomers exist in pairs, which means that the hydrogen is located at one of two positions, and even more specifically the most common form involves a hydrogen changing places with a double bond: H−X−Y=Z ⇌ X=Y−Z−H. Common tautomeric pairs include:

- ketone – enol: H−O−C=C ⇌ O=C−C−H, see keto–enol tautomerism
- enamine – imine: H−N−C=C ⇌ N=C−C−H
  - cyanamide – carbodiimide
  - guanidine – guanidine – guanidine: With a central carbon surrounded by three nitrogens, a guanidine group allows this transform in three possible orientations
- amide – imidic acid: H−N−C=O ⇌ N=C−O−H (e.g., the latter is encountered during nitrile hydrolysis reactions)
  - lactam – lactim, a cyclic form of amide-imidic acid tautomerism in 2-pyridone and derived structures such as the nucleobases guanine, thymine, and cytosine
- imine – imine, e.g., during pyridoxal phosphate catalyzed enzymatic reactions
  - R^{1}R^{2}C(=NCHR^{3}R^{4}) ⇌ (R^{1}R^{2}CHN=)CR^{3}R^{4}
- nitro – aci-nitro (nitronic acid): RR'HC−N^{+}(=O)(O^{−}) ⇌ RR'C=N^{+}(O^{−})(OH)
- nitroso – oxime: H−C−N=O ⇌ C=N−O−H
- ketene – ynol, which involves a triple bond: H−C=C=O ⇌ C≡C−O−H
- amino acid – ammonium carboxylate, which applies to the building blocks of the proteins. This shifts the proton more than two atoms away, producing a zwitterion rather than shifting a double bond: H_{2}N−CH_{2}−COOH ⇌ H_{3}N^{+}−CH_{2}−CO^{−}_{2}
- phosphite – phosphonate: P(OR)_{2}(OH) ⇌ HP(OR)_{2}(=O) between trivalent and pentavalent phosphorus.

== Prototropy ==
Prototropy is the most common form of tautomerism and refers to the relocation of a hydrogen atom. Prototropic tautomerism may be considered a subset of acid-base behavior. Prototropic tautomers are sets of isomeric protonation states with the same empirical formula and total charge. Tautomerizations are catalyzed by:

- bases, involving a series of steps: deprotonation, formation of a delocalized anion (e.g., an enolate), and protonation at a different position of the anion; and
- acids, involving a series of steps: protonation, formation of a delocalized cation, and deprotonation at a different position adjacent to the cation).

Glucose can exist in both a straight-chain and ring form.

Two specific further subcategories of tautomerizations:

- Annular tautomerism is a type of prototropic tautomerism wherein a proton can occupy two or more positions of the heterocyclic systems found in many drugs, for example, 1H- and 3H-imidazole; 1H-, 2H- and 4H- 1,2,4-triazole; 1H- and 2H- isoindole.
- Ring–chain tautomers occur when the movement of the proton is accompanied by a change from an open structure to a ring, such as the open chain and cyclic hemiacetal (typically pyranose or furanose forms) of many sugars. (See Carbohydrate § Ring-straight chain isomerism.) The tautomeric shift can be described as H−O ⋅ C=O ⇌ O−C−O−H, where the "⋅" indicates the initial absence of a bond.

== Valence tautomerism ==
Valence tautomerism is a type of tautomerism in which single and/or double bonds are rapidly formed and ruptured, without migration of atoms or groups. It is distinct from prototropic tautomerism, and involves processes with rapid reorganisation of bonding electrons.

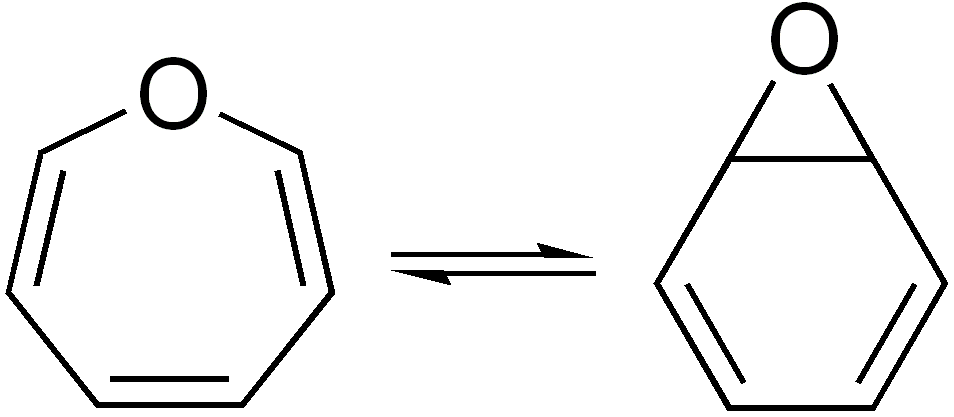
Oxepin – benzene oxide equilibrium

A pair of valence tautomers with formula C_{6}H_{6}O are benzene oxide and oxepin.

Other examples of this type of tautomerism can be found in bullvalene, and in open and closed forms of certain heterocycles, such as organic azides and tetrazoles, or mesoionic münchnone and acylamino ketene.

Valence tautomerism requires a change in molecular geometry and should not be confused with canonical resonance structures or mesomers.

== Inorganic materials ==
In inorganic extended solids, valence tautomerism can manifest itself in the change of oxidation states its spatial distribution upon the change of macroscopic thermodynamic conditions. Such effects have been called charge ordering or valence mixing to describe the behavior in inorganic oxides.

== Consequences for chemical databases ==
The existence of multiple possible tautomers for individual chemical substances can lead to confusion. For example, samples of 2-pyridone and 2-hydroxypyridine do not exist as separate isolatable materials: the two tautomeric forms are interconvertible and the proportion of each depends on factors such as temperature, solvent, and additional substituents attached to the main ring.

Historically, each form of the substance was entered into databases such as those maintained by the Chemical Abstracts Service and given separate CAS Registry Numbers. 2-Pyridone was assigned [142-08-5] and 2-hydroxypyridine [109-10-4]. The latter is now a "replaced" registry number so that look-up by either identifier reaches the same entry. The facility to automatically recognise such potential tautomerism and ensure that all tautomers are indexed together has been greatly facilitated by the creation of the International Chemical Identifier (InChI) and associated software. Thus the standard InChI for either tautomer is InChI=1S/C5H5NO/c7-5-3-1-2-4-6-5/h1-4H,(H,6,7).

== See also ==
- Fluxional molecule – Molecules whose atoms interchange between symmetric positions
