= Armesocarb =

Chemical compound

Clinical data
- Other names: (R)-Mesocarb; L-Mesocarb; MLR-1019; MLR1019
- Drug class: Atypical dopamine reuptake inhibitor

Identifiers
- IUPAC name: N-phenyl-N'-[3-[(2R)-1-phenylpropan-2-yl]oxadiazol-3-ium-5-yl]carbamimidate
- CAS Number: 34262-84-5
- PubChem CID: 7130196
- ChemSpider: 5473777
- UNII: UMT8MP2NDU

Chemical and physical data
- Formula: C_{18}H_{18}N_{4}O_{2}
- Molar mass: 322.368 g·mol^{−1}
- 3D model (JSmol): Interactive image
- SMILES: C[C@H](CC1=CC=CC=C1)[N+]2=NOC(=C2)N=C(NC3=CC=CC=C3)[O-]
- InChI: InChI=1S/C18H18N4O2/c1-14(12-15-8-4-2-5-9-15)22-13-17(24-21-22)20-18(23)19-16-10-6-3-7-11-16/h2-11,13-14H,12H2,1H3,(H-,19,20,21,23)/t14-/m1/s1; Key:OWFUPROYPKGHMH-CQSZACIVSA-N

Armesocarb (developmental code name MLR-1019), also known as (R)-mesocarb or L-mesocarb, is a selective atypical dopamine reuptake inhibitor (DRI). It is currently under development for the treatment of Parkinson's disease and sleep disorders.

It is the active (R)-enantiomer of the formerly clinically used stimulant-like drug mesocarb (MLR-1017; brand name Sydnocarb).

== Pharmacology ==
Mesocarb is known to be a highly selective DRI. However, in 2021, it was discovered that mesocarb is not a conventional DRI but acts as a dopamine transporter (DAT) allosteric modulator or non-competitive inhibitor.

In accordance with its nature as an atypical DAT blocker, the drug exhibits atypical effects compared to conventional DRIs. For example, mesocarb shows greater antiparkinsonian activity in animals compared to other DRIs.

Mesocarb has wakefulness-promoting effects in animals. Armesocarb, as the active enantiomer of mesocarb, shows greater therapeutic potency than the racemic form in animals. In contrast, the (S)- or D-enantiomer of mesocarb is virtually inactive in animal behavioral tests.

== History ==
Armesocarb was first described in the scientific literature as an enantiopure compound by 2005 and again in 2017.

== Clinical studies ==
As of April 2023, armesocarb is undergoing phase 1 clinical trials for Parkinson's disease and is in preclinical development for sleep disorders. The latter indication may specifically target excessive daytime sleepiness (EDS) in people with Parkinson's disease. Armesocarb is also in development for the treatment of levodopa-induced dyskinesia.

== See also ==
- List of investigational narcolepsy and hypersomnia drugs
- List of investigational Parkinson's disease drugs
- List of Russian drugs
- MRZ-9547 ((R)-phenylpiracetam)
