= Linsidomine =

Chemical compound

Clinical data
- Other names: SIN-1
- AHFS/Drugs.com: International Drug Names
- ATC code: C01DX18 (WHO)

Identifiers
- IUPAC name: 5-imino-3-morpholin-4-yl-5H-1,2,3-oxadiazol-3-ium-2-ide
- CAS Number: 33876-97-0 16142-27-1 (hydrochloride)
- PubChem CID: 5219
- ChemSpider: 10561427
- UNII: 5O5U71P6VQ
- KEGG: D07161
- CompTox Dashboard (EPA): DTXSID501026026

Chemical and physical data
- Formula: C_{6}H_{10}N_{4}O_{2}
- Molar mass: 170.172 g·mol^{−1}
- 3D model (JSmol): Interactive image
- SMILES: C1COCCN1[N+]2=NOC(=C2)[NH-]
- InChI: InChI=1S/C6H10N4O2/c7-6-5-10(8-12-6)9-1-3-11-4-2-9/h5,7H,1-4H2; Key:FKDHHVKWGRFRTG-UHFFFAOYSA-N

Linsidomine (3-morpholinosydnonimine or SIN-1) is a vasodilator. It is a metabolite of the antianginal drug molsidomine and acts by releasing NO from the endothelial cells nonenzymatically. It also hyperpolarizes the cell membrane through influencing the sodium-potassium pump and thereby rendering it less responsive to adrenergic stimulation. Linsidomine injection at a dose of 1 mg produces usable erection in about 70% of patients and full erection in up to 50% of patients. Linsidomine does not appear to be associated with priapism.

Linsidomine is neurotoxic and promotes oxidative stress on neurons. Linsidomine is a peroxynitrite-generating compound involved in the pathogenesis of neurodegenerative diseases.
