= Mesocarb =

Stimulant drug

Clinical data
- Trade names: Sidnocarb, Sydnocarb, Synocarb
- Other names: Fensidnimine; Pharmaneocarb; Sydnocarbum; MLR-1017; N-Phenylcarbamoyl-3-(β-phenylisopropyl)sydnonimine; 3-(β-Phenylisopropyl)-N-phenylcarbamoylsydnonimine
- Routes of administration: Oral
- Drug class: Atypical dopamine reuptake inhibitor
- ATC code: None

Legal status
- Legal status: BR: Class B1 (Psychoactive drugs); CA: Schedule III; DE: Anlage II (Authorized trade only, not prescriptible); UK: Class C; US: Schedule I

Pharmacokinetic data
- Metabolism: Hepatic
- Excretion: Renal

Identifiers
- IUPAC name: 5-(Phenylcarbamoylimino)-3-(1-phenylpropan-2-yl)-5H-1,2,3-oxadiazol-3-ium-2-ide
- CAS Number: 34262-84-5
- PubChem CID: 9551611
- PubChem SID: 497621129
- ChemSpider: 16736988
- UNII: UMT8MP2NDU
- KEGG: D12716
- CompTox Dashboard (EPA): DTXSID10900961

Chemical and physical data
- Formula: C_{18}H_{18}N_{4}O_{2}
- Molar mass: 322.368 g·mol^{−1}
- 3D model (JSmol): Interactive image
- SMILES: O=C(\N=C1/C=[N+](\[N-]O1)C(C)Cc2ccccc2)Nc3ccccc3
- InChI: InChI=1S/C18H18N4O2/c1-14(12-15-8-4-2-5-9-15)22-13-17(24-21-22)20-18(23)19-16-10-6-3-7-11-16/h2-11,13-14H,12H2,1H3,(H,19,23)/b20-17+; Key:DMHQLXUFCQSQQQ-LVZFUZTISA-N

Mesocarb, sold under the brand name Sidnocarb or Sydnocarb and known by the developmental code name MLR-1017, is a stimulant medication which has been used in the treatment of psychiatric disorders and for a number of other indications in the Soviet Union and Russia. It is currently undergoing research trials for potential application in treating Parkinson's disease and sleep disorders. It is taken by mouth.

The drug is a selective dopamine reuptake inhibitor (DRI). It is an unusual and unique DRI, acting as a negative allosteric modulator and non-competitive inhibitor of the dopamine transporter (DAT). Chemically, mesocarb contains amphetamine within its structure but has been modified and extended at the amine with a sydnone imine-containing moiety.

Mesocarb was first described by 1971. It was used as a pharmaceutical drug until 2008. In 2021, its nature as a DAT allosteric modulator was reported. As of February 2023, mesocarb was in phase 1 clinical trials for Parkinson's disease. The active enantiomer, armesocarb, is also being developed.

== Medical uses ==
Mesocarb was originally developed in the Soviet Union in the 1970s for a variety of indications including asthenia, apathy, adynamia, and some clinical aspects of depression and schizophrenia. Mesocarb was used for counteracting the sedative effects of benzodiazepines, increasing workload capacity and cardiovascular function, treatment of attention deficit hyperactivity disorder (ADHD) in children, as a nootropic, and as a drug to enhance resistance to extremely cold temperatures. It has also been reported to have antidepressant and anticonvulsant properties.

=== Available forms ===
Mesocarb was sold in Russia as 5 mg oral tablets under the brand name Sydnocarb.

== Pharmacology ==
=== Pharmacodynamics ===
Mesocarb has been found to act as a selective dopamine reuptake inhibitor (DRI) by blocking the actions of the dopamine transporter (DAT), and lacks the dopamine release characteristic of stimulants such as dextroamphetamine. It was the most selective DAT inhibitor amongst an array of other DAT inhibitors to which it was compared and, in 2017, was reported as the most selective DAT inhibitor described to date.

The affinities (K_{i}) of mesocarb at the human monoamine transporters in vitro have been reported to be 8.3 nM for the dopamine transporter (DAT), 1,500 nM for the norepinephrine transporter (NET) (181-fold lower than for the DAT), and >10,000 nM for the serotonin transporter (SERT) (>1,205-fold lower than for the DAT). The inhibitory potencies (IC_{50}) of mesocarb at the human monoamine transporters in vitro have been reported to be 0.49 ± 0.14 μM at the DAT, 34.9 ± 14.08 μM at the NET (71-fold lower than for the DAT), and 494.9 ± 17.00 μM at the SERT (1,010-fold lower than for the DAT).

In 2021, it was discovered that mesocarb is not a conventional DRI but acts as a DAT allosteric modulator or non-competitive inhibitor. In accordance with its nature as an atypical DAT blocker, the drug has atypical effects relative to conventional DRIs. As an example, it shows greater antiparkinsonian activity relative to other DRIs in animals.

Similarly to other DRIs, mesocarb has been found to possess wakefulness-promoting effects.

=== Pharmacokinetics ===
Hydroxylated metabolites can be detected in urine for up to 10 days after consumption.

Mesocarb had erroneously been referred to as a prodrug of amphetamine. However, this was based on older literature that relied on gas chromatography as an analytical method. Subsequently, with the advent of mass spectroscopy, it has been shown that presence of amphetamine in prior studies was an artifact of the gas chromatography method. More recent studies using mass spectroscopy show that negligible levels of amphetamine are released from mesocarb metabolism.

== Chemistry ==
Mesocarb, also known as 3-(β-phenylisopropyl)-N-phenylcarbamoylsydnonimine, is a substituted phenethylamine and amphetamine and a mesoionic sydnone imine. It has the amphetamine backbone present, except that the R_{N} has a complicated imine side chain present.

Whereas mesocarb (MLR-1017) is a racemic mixture, the enantiopure levorotatory or (R)-enantiomer is known as armesocarb (MLR-1019). Armesocarb is described as the active enantiomer of mesocarb, whereas the (S)- or D-enantiomer is said to be virtually inactive.

It is structurally related to feprosidnine (Sydnophen; 3-(α-methylphenylethyl)sydnone imine).

=== Synthesis ===
Patents:

Feprosidnine (Sydnophen) is converted from the hydrochloride salt (1) into the freebase amine (2). This is then treated with phenylisocyanate (3).

== History ==
Mesocarb was first described in the scientific literature by 1971. It is said to have been used as a pharmaceutical drug from 1971 until 2008. It was said to have been discontinued by its manufacturer in 2008 for business reasons unrelated to the drug itself.

== Society and culture ==
=== Names ===
Mesocarb is the generic name of the drug and its INN. It is also known by the synonym fensidnimine as well as by the brand names Sydnocarb and Synocarb. The drug is additionally known by its developmental code name MLR-1017 (for Parkinson's disease).

=== Status ===
Mesocarb is almost unknown in the western world and is neither used in medicine nor studied scientifically to any great extent outside of Russia and other countries in the former Soviet Union. It has however been added to the list of drugs under international control and is a scheduled substance in most countries, despite its multiple therapeutic applications and reported lack of significant abuse potential.

== Research ==
=== Parkinson's disease ===
Mesocarb, has been under development for the treatment of Parkinson's disease since 2016. As of February 2023, it is in phase 1 clinical trials for this indication. However, no recent development has been reported. Mesocarb's active enantiomer armesocarb is also under development.

== See also ==
- List of Russian drugs
- List of investigational Parkinson's disease drugs
