= Mesoionic compounds =

Molecules with dipolar heterocyclic structures and delocalized charges

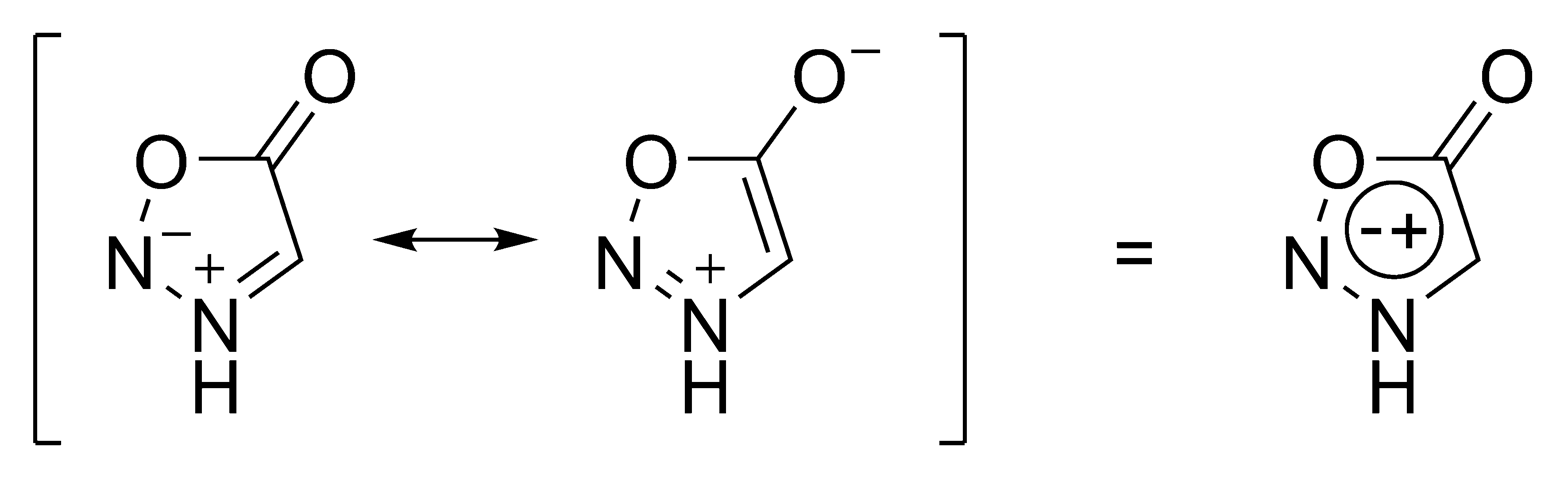
Sydnone structures are mesoionic

In chemistry, mesoionic compounds are one in which a heterocyclic structure is dipolar and where both the negative and the positive charges are delocalized. A completely uncharged structure cannot be written and mesoionic compounds cannot be represented satisfactorily by any one mesomeric structure. Mesoionic compounds are a subclass of betaines. Examples are sydnones and sydnone imines (e.g. the stimulant mesocarb), münchnones, and mesoionic carbenes.

The formal positive charge is associated with the ring atoms and the formal negative charge is associated either with ring atoms or an exocyclic nitrogen or other atom. These compounds are stable zwitterionic compounds and belong to nonbenzenoid aromatics.

== See also ==
- Mesomeric betaine
